= Sophie Debon =

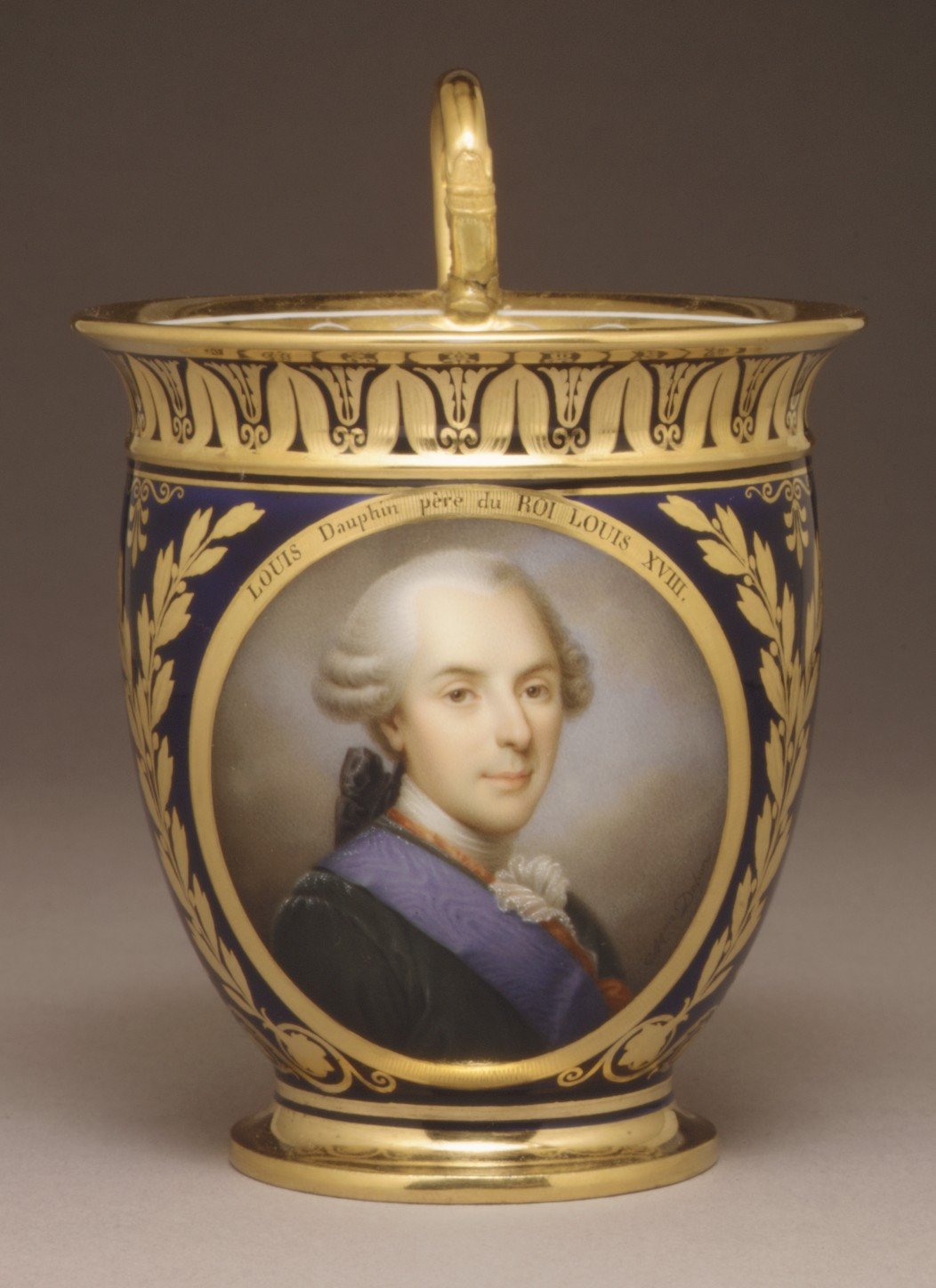
A decorative cup painted by Bompart-Debon

Sophie Debon née Bompart, (1787–1848) was a French decorative porcelain painter active in Paris during the first half of the nineteenth century. She specialised in history painting and portraiture, producing works including copies after Old Masters, and regularly exhibited at the Paris Salon between 1817 and 1833.

== Biography ==
Marie Alexandrine Sophie Bompart was born in Paris in 1787 to Nicolas François Bompart and Marie Anne Chenié. She trained as a porcelain painter under Marie-Victoire Jaquotot, a leading figure in the discipline, who ran a private atelier that trained approximately thirty women artists at a time. Debon entered Jaquotot’s atelier in 1816, through her joining the Manufacture nationale de Sèvres the same year.

After her marriage to Jacques François Debon on 25 September 1806, Bompart-Debon worked professionally under the name Madame Debon. Throughout her career, she produced painted porcelain portraits and narrative scenes after Old Masters as well as from life, a practice characteristic of high-end decorative painting during the Restoration and July Monarchy.

Bompart-Debon lived and worked throughout the central north east of Paris throughout her career, residing successively in the rue de Ménilmontant, rue Saint-Sébastien, rue de Jouy, and later rue de Buffault. She died at her studio in Paris in April 1848.

== Career ==
Bompart-Debon belonged to a generation of women artists who found professional opportunities in porcelain painting, a field that allowed for both technical training and commercial visibility. Through her association with Sèvres, France's leading ceramics factory, she worked alongside some of the most respected porcelain artists of her time, including Jaquotot and Adélaïde Ducluzeau.

Bompart-Debon's works are grounded in portraiture, religious subjects, mythological and historical scenes and porcelain paintings after the Old Masters. Her clientele included members of the aristocracy, notably the Duchess of Berry, a central figure of the Bourbon Restoration.

== Salon Exhibitions ==
Bompart-Debon exhibited regularly at the Paris Salon. Between 1817 and 1833 she showed the following:

1817

Address: 32 rue Saint-Sébastien

Paintings on porcelain

- Portrait de Ducis, after Gérard
- Portrait de Mlle de Fontanges, after Mignard
- Portrait of Rigaud’s mother, after Rigaud
- Portrait of Mme B., from life
- Study after a fresco by Sodoma

1819

Address: 11 rue de Jouy

Paintings on porcelain

- The Virgin of Foligno, after Raphael
- Head of a Virgin, after Raphael
- The Magdalene in the Desert, after Correggio
- A Conversation at the House of Aspasia, after Meynier
- Young Girl Playing with a Dog, after Adriaen van der Werff

1822

Address: 11 rue de Jouy

- Portrait of Her Royal Highness Madame the Duchess of Berry, after Kinson
- Portrait of Mme H.

1833

Address: 13 rue de Buffault

- Portrait of Mme la baronne M., from life, on porcelain
