= Manufacture nationale de Sèvres =

French ceramics factory

Coordinates: 48°49′43″N 2°13′21″E

The Manufacture nationale de Sèvres (pronounced [manyfaktyʁ nɑsjɔnal də sɛvʁ]) is one of the principal European porcelain factories. It is located in Sèvres, Hauts-de-Seine, France. It is the continuation of Vincennes porcelain, founded in 1740, which moved to Sèvres in 1756. It has been owned by the French crown or government since 1759.

Its production is still largely based on the creation of contemporary objects today. It became part of the Cité de la céramique in 2010 with the Musée national de céramique, and since 2012 with the Musée national Adrien Dubouché in Limoges.

== History ==
=== Origins ===
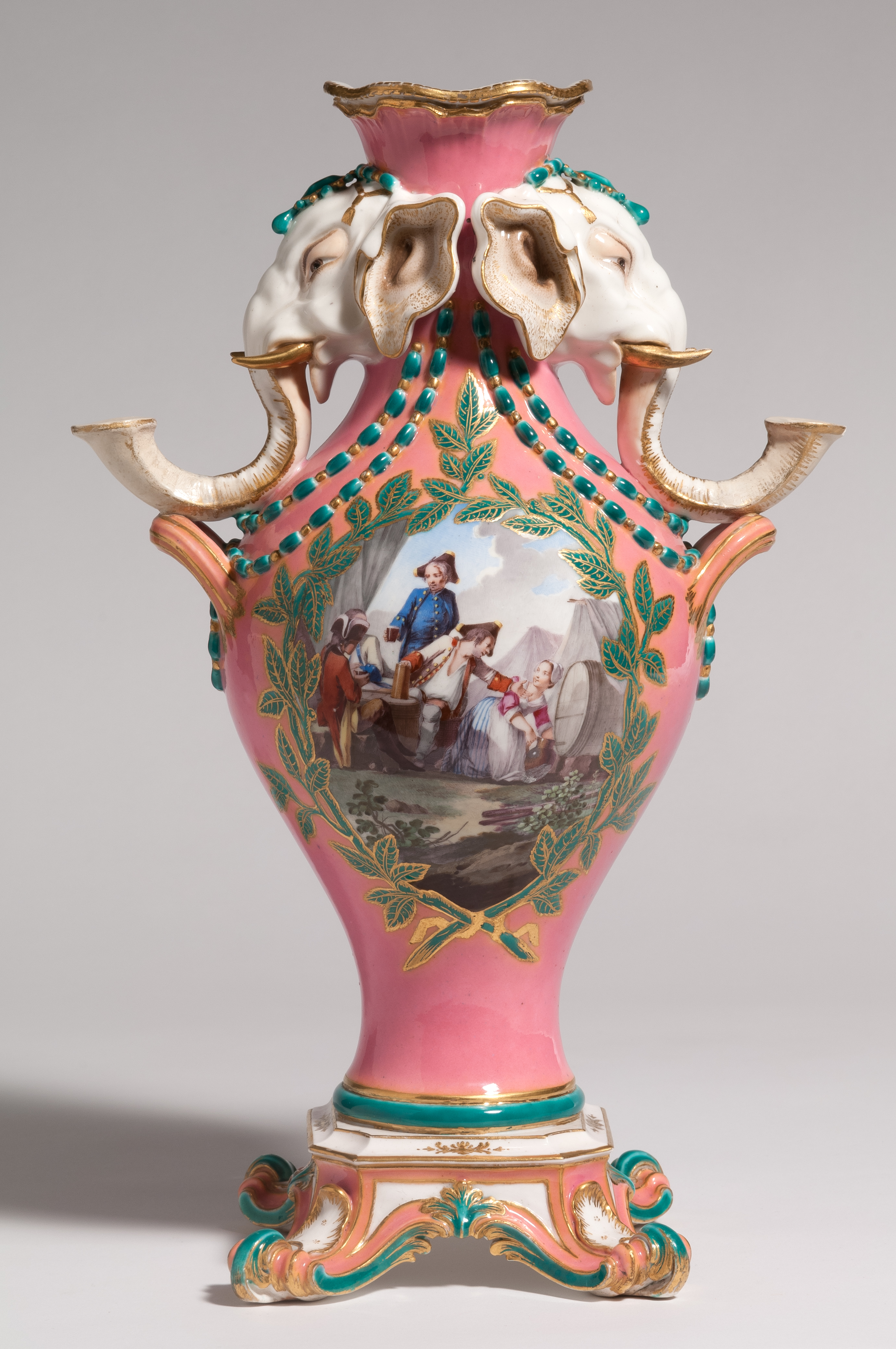
Elephant vase with candleholders, c. 1760

In 1740, the Manufacture de Vincennes was founded, thanks to the support of Louis XV's Polish born wife, Queen Marie Leszczyńska who was noted as an avid porcelain collector in her early years as queen. According to the memoirs of Charles Philippe d'Albert, 4th Duke of Luynes it was Queen Marie who originally promoted porcelain in Versailles by having regular commissions such as the first colored porcelain flowers presented to her by the company in her royal apartments in April 1748 in order to compete with the Chantilly porcelain and Meissen porcelain in Germany. Louis XV's mistress Madame de Pompadour then followed and became a patron in 1751. By 1756, the manufactury was moved to a building in Sèvres, built at the initiative of Madame de Pompadour, near her Château de Bellevue.

One hundred thirty metres long and four storeys high, the building was erected between 1753 and 1756 by the architect Laurent Lindet on the site of a farm called "de la Guyarde." There was a central pavilion surmounted by a pediment with a clock from the old royal glass-makers on the fourth level, with two long wings terminating in corner pavilions at each end. In front of the pavilion was a "public" courtyard, enclosed by a wrought-iron fence. This front area was decorated twice a month in order to hold parties for visitors.

The ground floor of the building contained clay reserves, books and storerooms of raw materials. The first floor contained the workshops of the moulders, plasterers, sculptors, engravers, and the ovens. On the second floor were the sculptors, turners, repairers and packers. Finally, the painters, gilders and makers of animals and figures worked in the loft.

Jean-Claude Chambellan Duplessis served as artistic director of the Vincennes porcelain manufactory and its successor at Sèvres from 1748 to his death in 1774. The manufactory was bought by the King in 1759, although Madame de Pompadour was allowed effective free rein to oversee it. A period of superb quality in both design and production followed, creating much of the enduring reputation of French porcelain. The light-hearted Rococo was given a more serious air, often by restricting it to the painting, rather than the porcelain shape.

=== Development of hard-paste porcelain ===
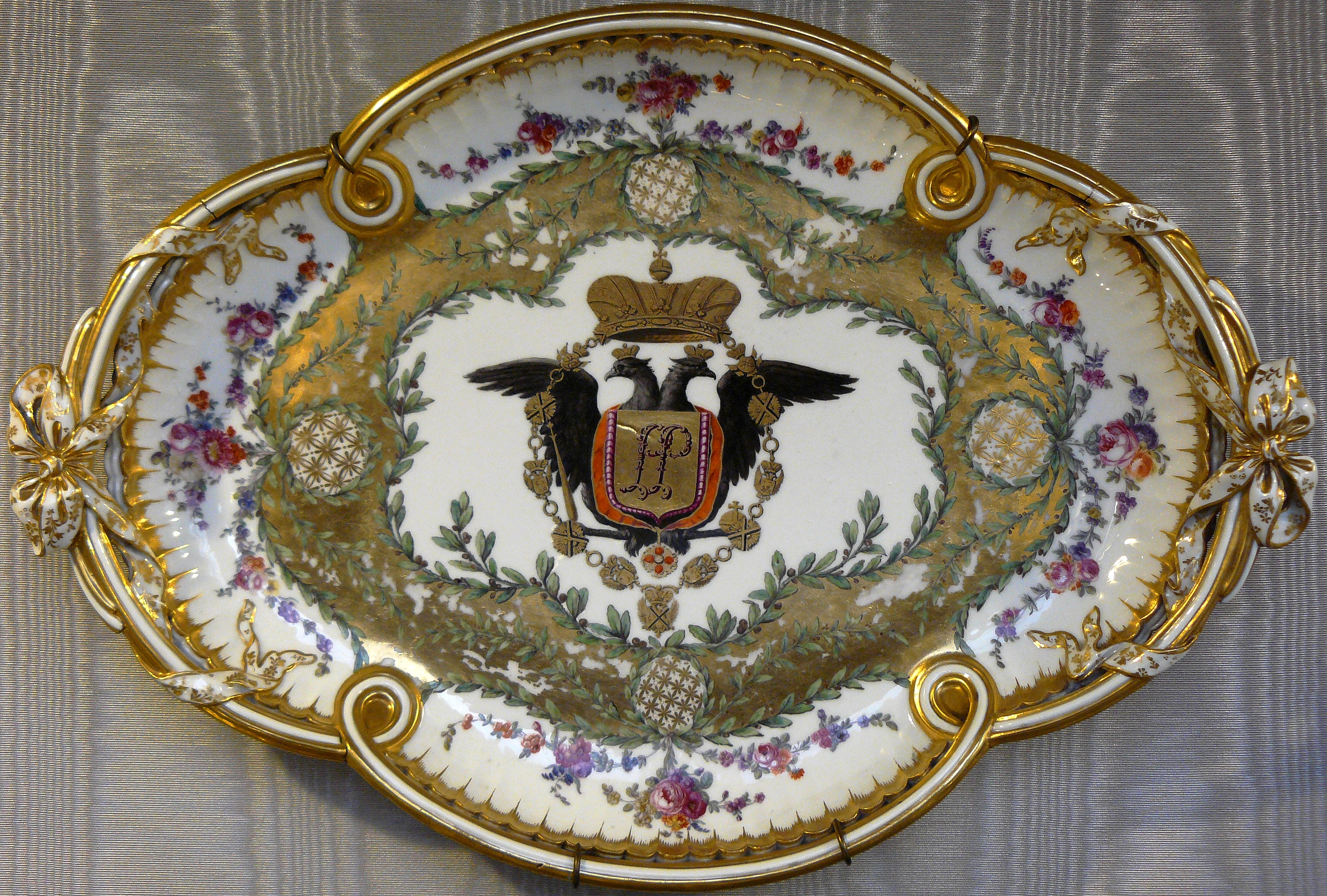
Hard-paste porcelain plate from a set of 8 pieces, with the monogram (in Roman letters) "PP" for Paul I of Russia (Pavel Petrovitch), 1773

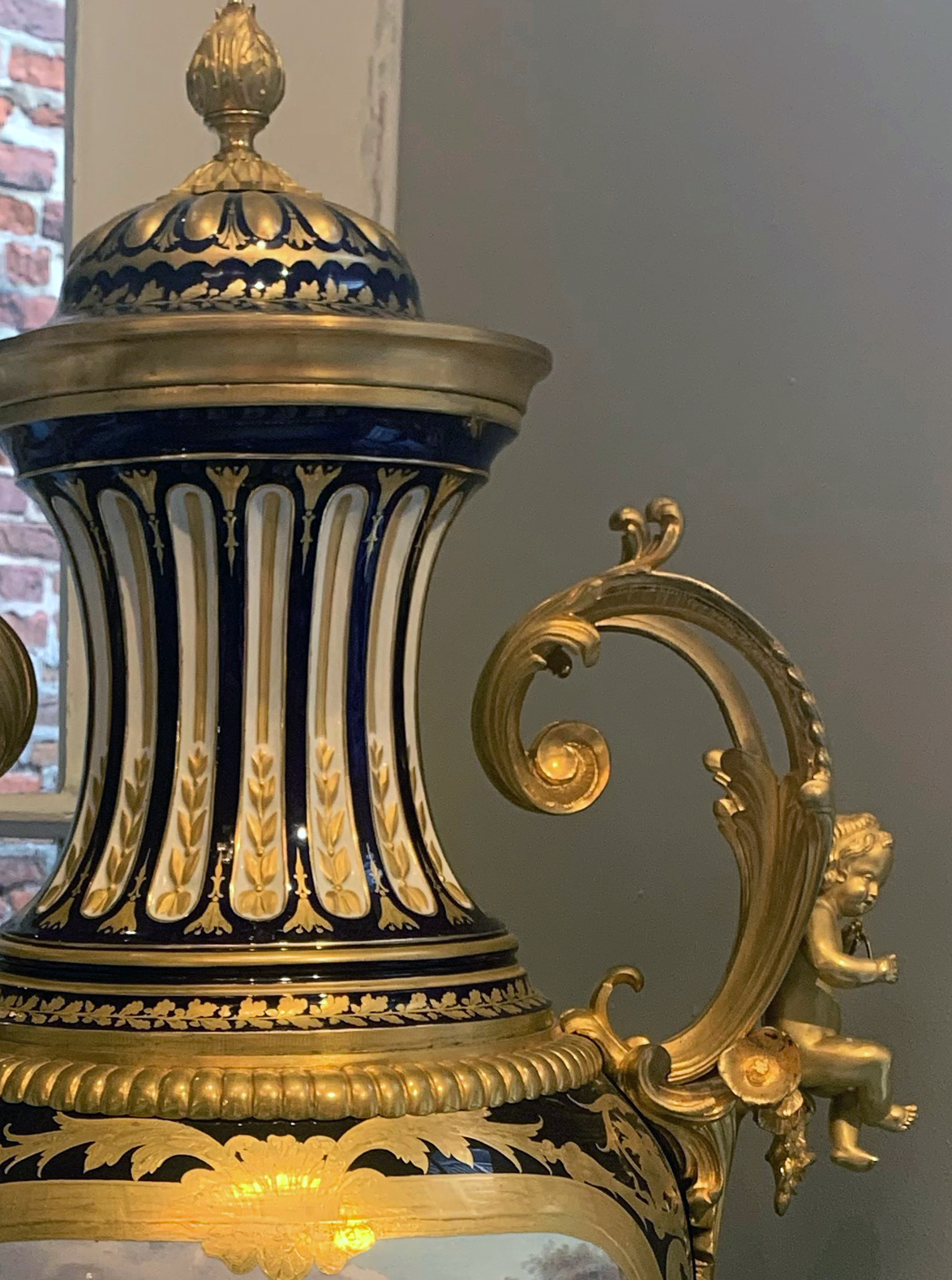
Detail of palace urn by Sèvres

Initially, the manufactory produced soft-paste porcelain. In 1768, the Bordeaux chemist, Vilaris and his friend Jean-Baptiste Darnet discovered the first deposit of kaolin on French soil at Saint-Yrieix-la-Perche to the south of Limoges. On 13 February 1771, the Comte de Thy de Milly of the Royal Academy of Sciences sent the academy a report on the creation of hard-paste porcelain. This report was published in 1777 in volume 7 of the encyclopedia, Art de la porcelaine. This work derived from his observations of the different manufacturies of Germany, especially Meissen. "Up to this time, the manufacturies of France – Sèvres not excepted – have only produced glass porcelain, which only has some qualities of the real thing...".

Hard-paste porcelain began to be manufactured in Sèvres after 1770, but soft-paste was also continued, only finally being dropped in 1804. Vincennes had made a certain amount of painted plaques that were sold to furniture-makers to be inset in furniture, but at Sèvres these became a significant part of production. Figures were almost entirely in unglazed biscuit porcelain, an "invention" of Vincennes.

Louis-Simon Boizot was director between 1774 and 1800. Even before the French Revolution, the initially severe style of Neoclassicism had begun to turn grandiose and ornate in goods for the courts of the Ancien Régime. This trend deepened with the rise of Napoleon, which followed a difficult period for French porcelain factories. The Empire style was marked by lavish gilding, strong colours, and references to military conquests; Napoleon's ultimately unsuccessful expedition to Egypt sparked a fashion for "Neo-Egyptian" wares.

In 1800 Napoleon, as First Consul, appointed Alexandre Brongniart director at Sèvres; he was to stay 47 years, making many changes. The factory concentrated on tableware and larger decorative pieces such as vases and table centrepieces, much of it for the government to use or give as diplomatic presents.

The Empire style grew more elaborate and ostentatious as the century continued, developing most aspects of "Victorian" taste in a French style. Under the Second Empire from 1852 to 1870, there was a revival of Louis XVI style at Sèvres, often more heavily painted and gilded. Many of the old moulds which the factory had kept were used again. Henri Victor Regnault became director in 1854.

In 1875, the manufactory was transferred to buildings which had been specially built by the French state next to the Parc de Saint-Cloud. It is still on this site today, classed as a Monument historique, but still in operation.

Sèvres turned to a more diluted version of Japonisme after 1870, and in 1897, a new artistic director, A. Sandier, introduced new Art Nouveau styles, followed about a decade later by styles leading to Art Deco.

In 1920, the Treaty of Sèvres, the peace treaty between the Ottoman Empire and Allies at the end of World War I, was signed at the factory.

=== Women at the royal manufactory ===
At the Manufacture de Vincennes, in 1748, a "floristry" composed of twenty young girls was established under the direction of Madame Gravant. It continued its activities until 1753, when women were banned from the factory. In 1756 Sèvres employed two hundred male workers.

"... The few women who continued to work at Vincennes and then at Sèvres, after this [the floristry], henceforth worked from home, picking up the wares, taking them home and bringing them back each day, despite the risk of breaking the delicate objects which they painted and burnished.".

Notable women artists who worked at the Manufacture under Brongniart's directorship include Marie-Victoire Jaquotot, Adélaïde Durand-Ducluzeau and Sophie Bompart-Debon.

== Production of porcelain ==
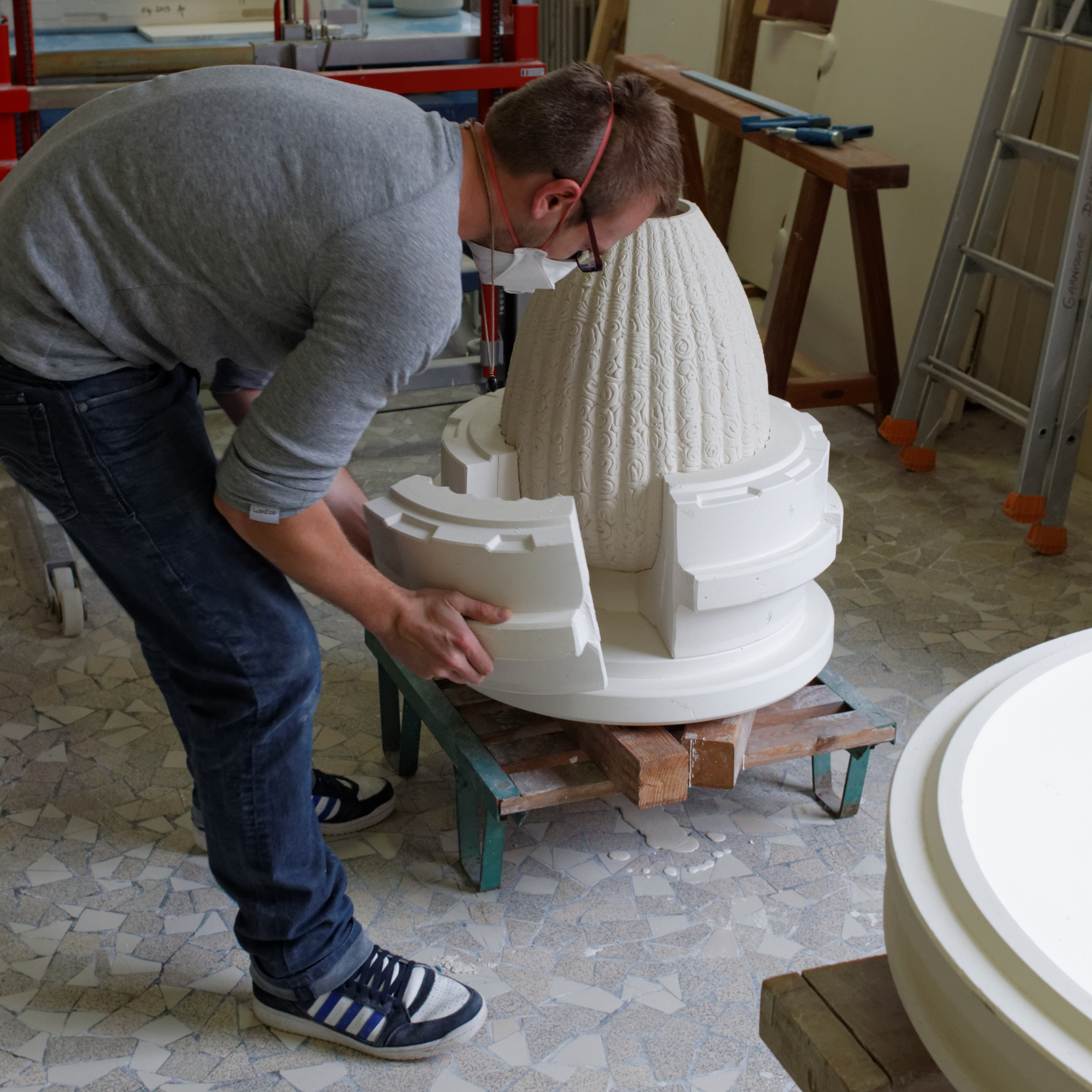
Removing the mould pieces from a vase

The factory retains a huge collection of moulds, going back to its beginning, and mixes the production of old and new shapes. Slipcasting is the main technique for "hollow" wares like vases.

The kaolin was brought, traditionally, from Saint-Yrieix near Limoges. Nowadays there are many sources. The glaze, applied as enamel over the kaolin paste after firing is made mainly of Marcognac pegmatite, mixed with feldspath and quart.

The blue of Sèvres is a characteristic colour of the manufactory. It is made from a cobalt oxide which is incorporated into the glaze.

=== 19th century kilns ===
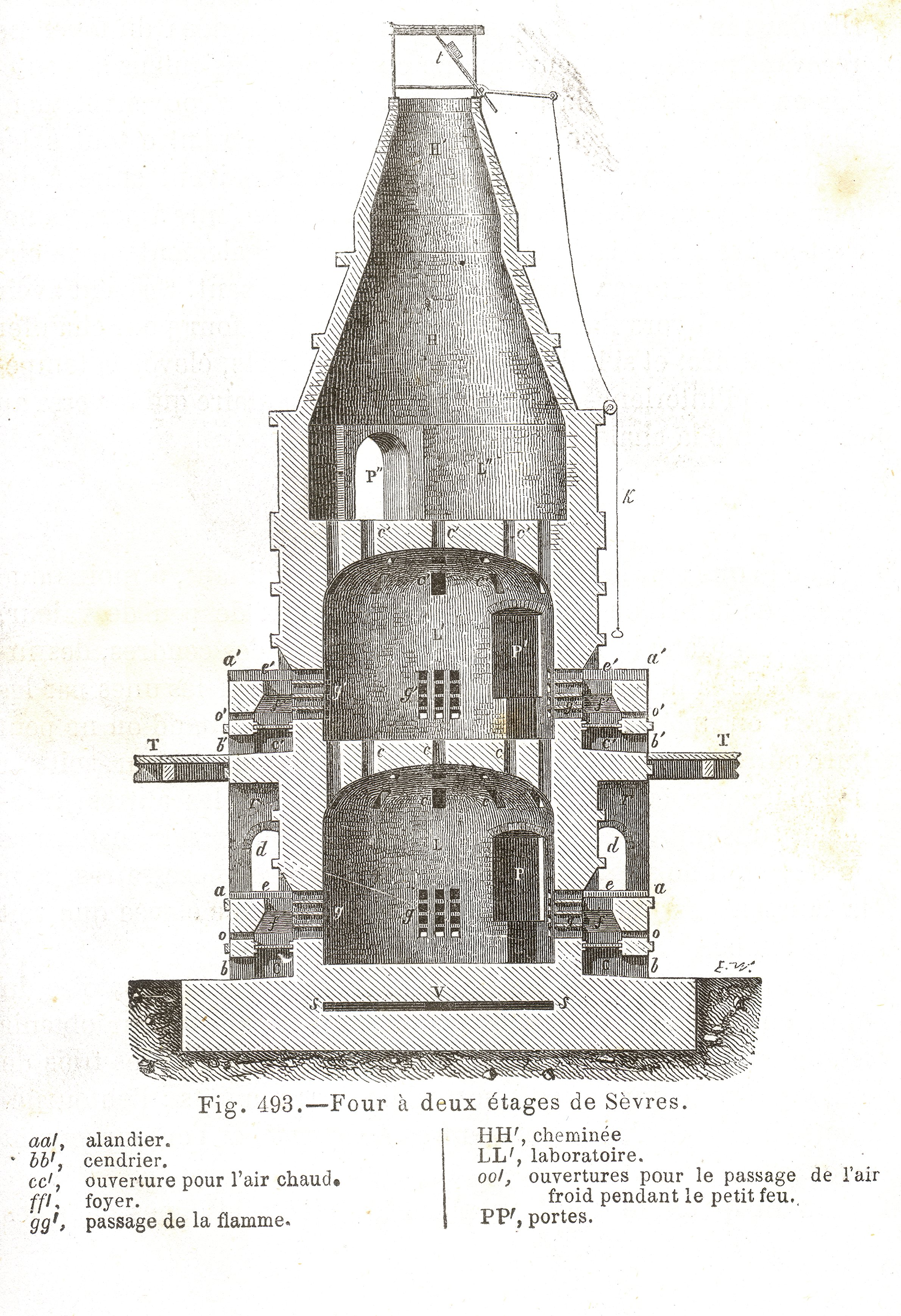
Two-storey Sèvres kiln, 1864

The ceramicist Ambroise Milet was Director of the Paste Kilns and Chief of Manufacture at the manufactury before he left it in 1883 at the age of 53. One of the key tasks of Ambroise Milet was the construction of six great Anagama kilns in 1877. These kilns are today classed as French monuments historiques.

The kilns consist of a cylindrical body separated into three levels. The lowest is called the "first laboratoire" and is 2.6 m in diameter and 3 m tall. The middle level is called the "second laboratoire" and is 2.6 metres in diameter and 2 metres high. The top level is the 2-metre-high chimney cone. The firebox is an opening at the bottom of the first laboratoire, 1 metre high, 0.58 metres wide and 0.29 metres deep. In the vault between the first and second laboratoires, is a large flue at the centre and 9 small ones around the edge. These flues serve to guide the flames and release the heated gas. Grills, called "flue-guards" are arranged to divide the flames. At the base of the second laboratoire, a little fire box helps to increase the temperature further. The oven contains four fireboxes for distributing the heat effectively.

Only birch wood is used to heat the oven. Its strong and quick combustion is uniform, its flames are long and it releases few cinders. Only this wood can bring the oven to the high temperatures required (800 °C in the small fires, nearly 1300 °C in the main one). The logs of wood are 73 cm long. The oven can fire biscuit porcelain in 15–16 hours and glass or glazed porcelain in 11–12 hours. One firing requires 25 cubic metres of wood, which is burnt over 48 hours using a specialised technique in order to raise the temperature. The oven then takes between fifteen and twenty days to cool down. The wall which blocks the oven door is dismantled in order to empty the oven. A hundred pieces are fired at once, depending on their exact size.

The firing process gives the incomparable enamel quality to the porcelain which cannot be obtained by other techniques. The cause of this is the high uniformity of heat in the oven and the extremely gradual cooling process. Among other things, these ovens are uniquely capable of producing large pieces, which Sèvres has made a speciality.

The last large firing with wood took place in October 2006. Nearly 180 pieces were produced for l'Epreuve du Feu ("the trial by flame"), the name of the exhibition which these pieces were displayed in at the Parisian gallery of the manufactury, before they were dispersed. The opening of the oven, as it began to burn, was broadcast live on television. The next firing will be announced on the official website of the manufactury.

Aside from these exceptional firings, the manufactory uses electric ovens for all contemporary production.

== Manufacture today ==
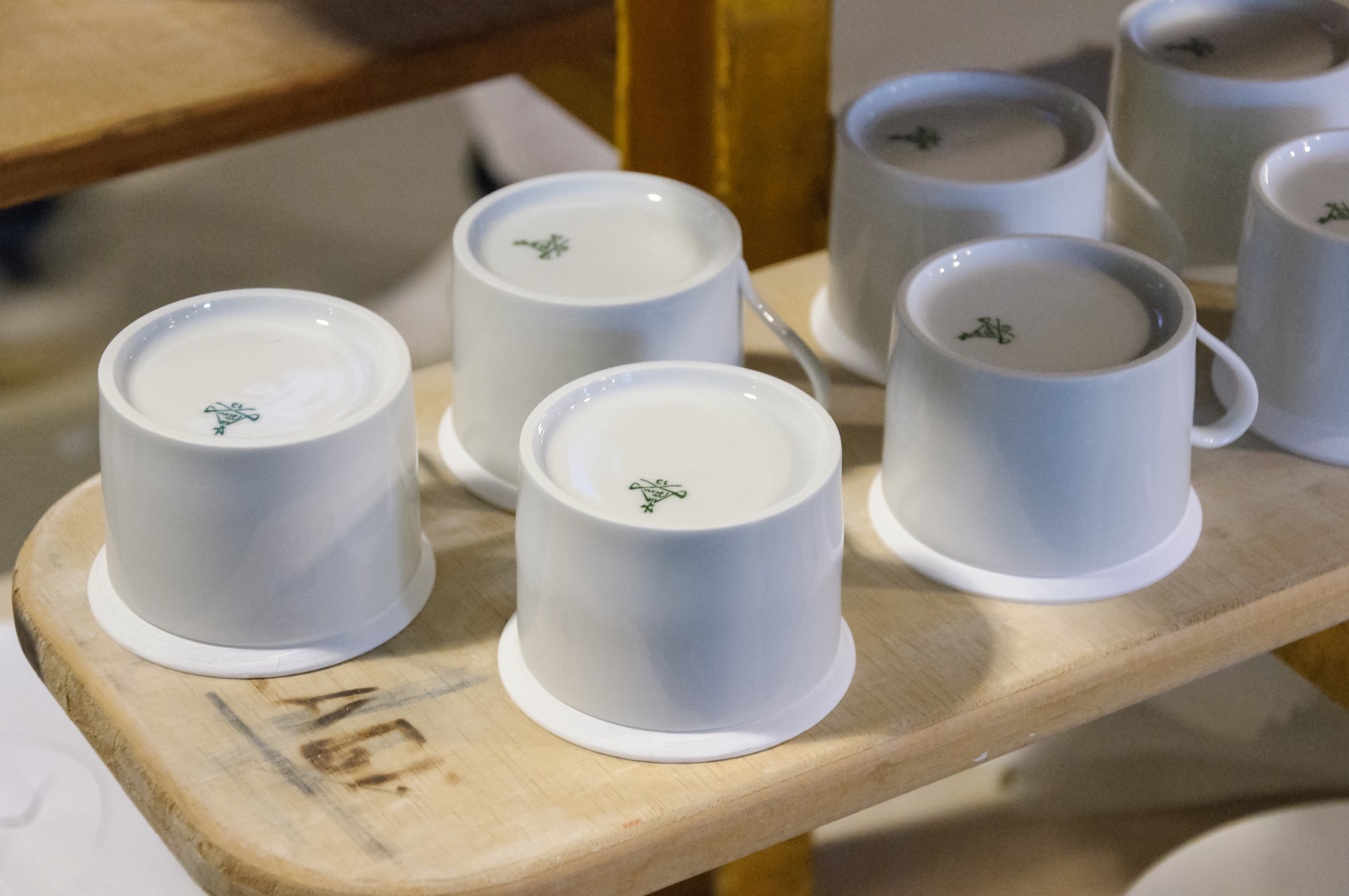
Tea cups from the Litron service, produced by a "white oven" bearing the mark of the manufacturer

Until 2009, the Manufacture nationale de Sèvres was a 'Service à compétence nationale' (national service) administered by the French ministry of culture and communication.

As a result of a decree of 26 December 2009, from 1 January 2010, the manufactory formed the public organisation Sèvres – Cité de la céramique (Sèvres – Ceramic City), along with the Musée national de la céramique. On 1 May 2012, the Musée national de la porcelaine Adrien-Dubouché was also made part of this public organisation, whose name was changed to Cité de la céramique – Sèvres et Limoges.

Since becoming a public organisation, its mission, in accordance with its origins in 1740, is to produce ceramic works of art using artisanal techniques, including both reproductions of old models and contemporary creations. It produces items both for state needs and commercial sale, and is charged with promoting technological and artistic research in ceramics. Its work is concentrated on the upmarket pieces, maintaining a high quality of artisanry, while neglecting industrial scale mass production.

The creations of the manufacturer are displayed in only two galleries: one in Sèvres and the other in the heart of Paris, in the 1st arrondissement, between the Louvre and the Comédie-Française. The manufacturer also organises numerous exhibitions around the world and participates in a number of contemporary art festivals.

== Musée national de Céramique (National Museum of Ceramics) ==
The National Museum of Ceramics is adjacent to the manufactory. An institution created in 1824, it also offers a collection that illustrates the diversity of ceramics across time and various regions.

== Notable artists ==
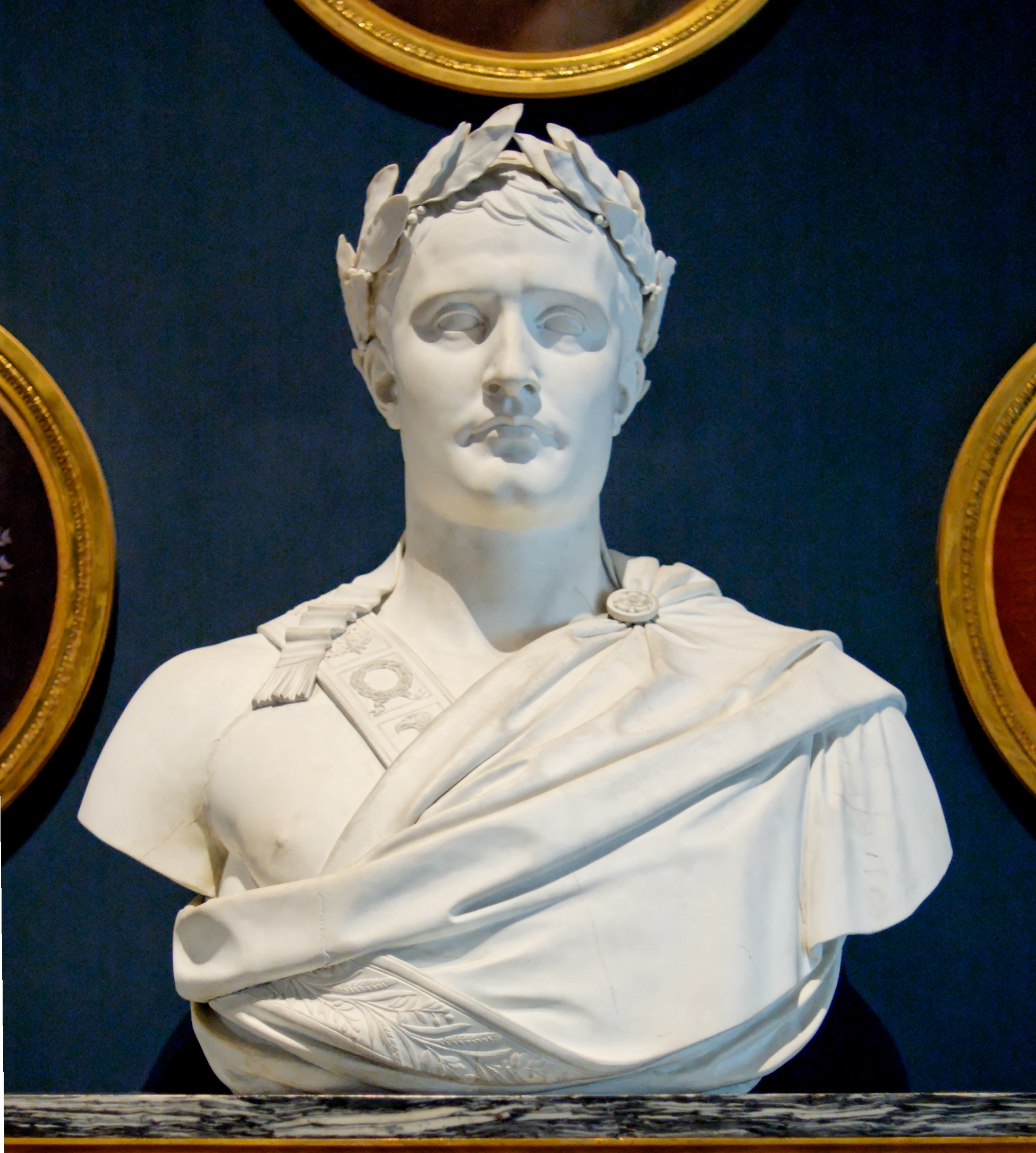
Bust of Napoleon by Antoine-Denis Chaudet (Louvre, 1811)

Due to its reputation for excellence and its prestige, the manufactory has always attracted some of the best ceramists. Among the best known are:

- Pierre Alechinsky
- Suzanne Estelle Apoil
- Arman
- Jean Arp
- Louis-Simon Boizot
- François Boucher
- Louise Bourgeois
- Félix Bracquemond
- Alexander Calder
- Albert-Ernest Carrier-Belleuse (artistic director)
- Ernest Chaplet
- Fanny Charrin
- Abraham Constantin, director of painting from 1813
- Hermine David
- Théodore Deck, director of the manufactory from 1887
- Martin Drolling, director of painting 1802-1813
- Jean-Claude Duplessis (or Duplessis père)
- Étienne Maurice Falconet
- Alexandre-Évariste Fragonard, son of Jean-Honoré Fragonard
- Viola Frey
- Hector Guimard
- Étienne Hajdu
- Yayoi Kusama
- François-Xavier Lalanne
- Espérance Langlois
- Polyclès Langlois
- Roberto Matta
- Jean-Louis Morin
- Guillaume Noël
- Richard Peduzzi
- Charles Percier
- Serge Poliakoff
- Henri Rapin
- Auguste Rodin
- Jacques-Émile Ruhlmann
- Adrian Saxe
- Ettore Sottsass
- Louis Jean Thévenet, père
- Giovanni Battista Tiepolo
- Betty Woodman
- Philippe Xhrouet

== Gallery ==
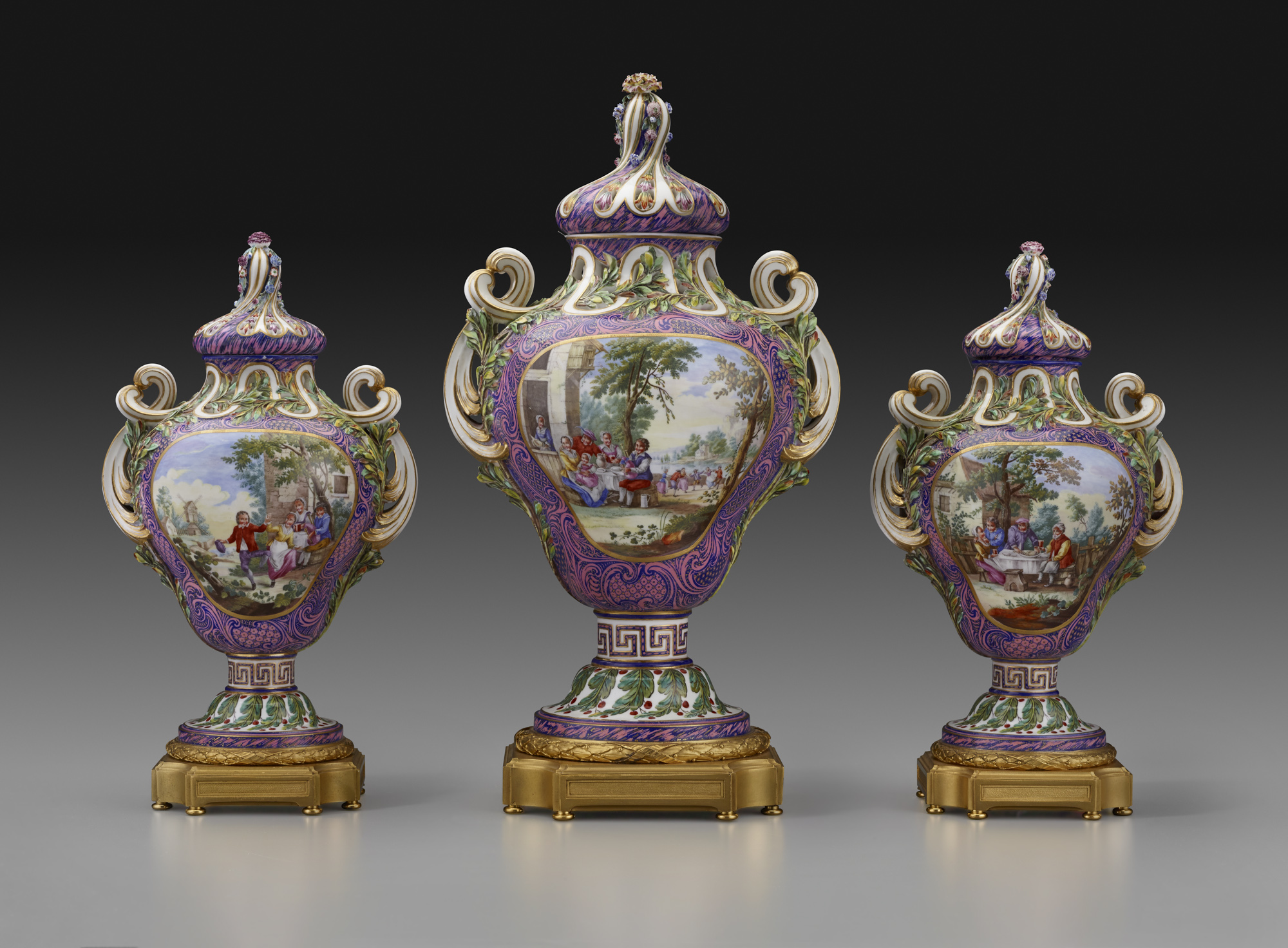
Pot-Pourri Myrte with Flemish Scenes and Landscapes, c. 1762, soft-paste porcelain on gilt bronze plinth, from the Frick Collection, NY

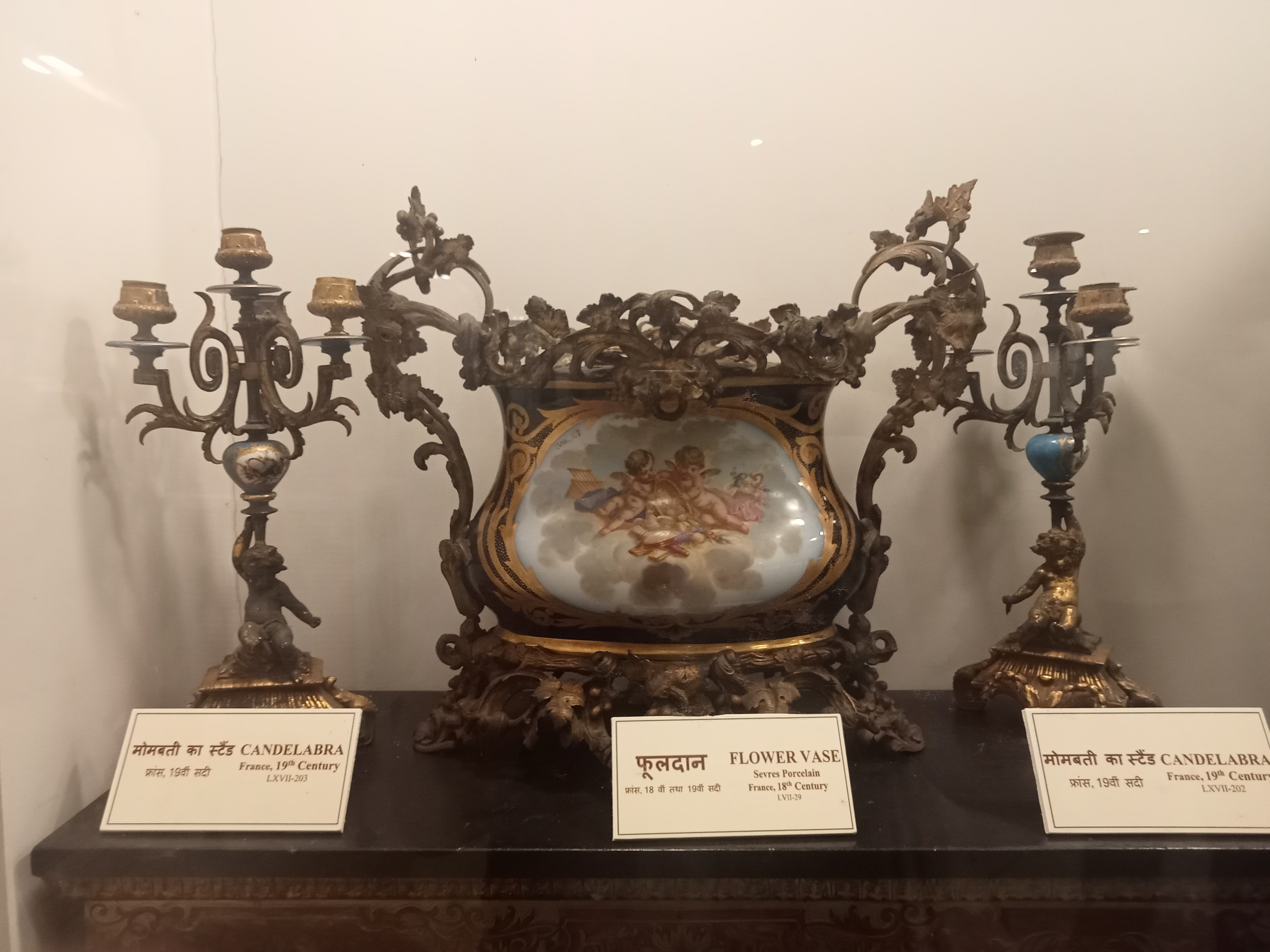
Sèvres flower vase from 18th century, Salar Jung Museum Hyderabad, India

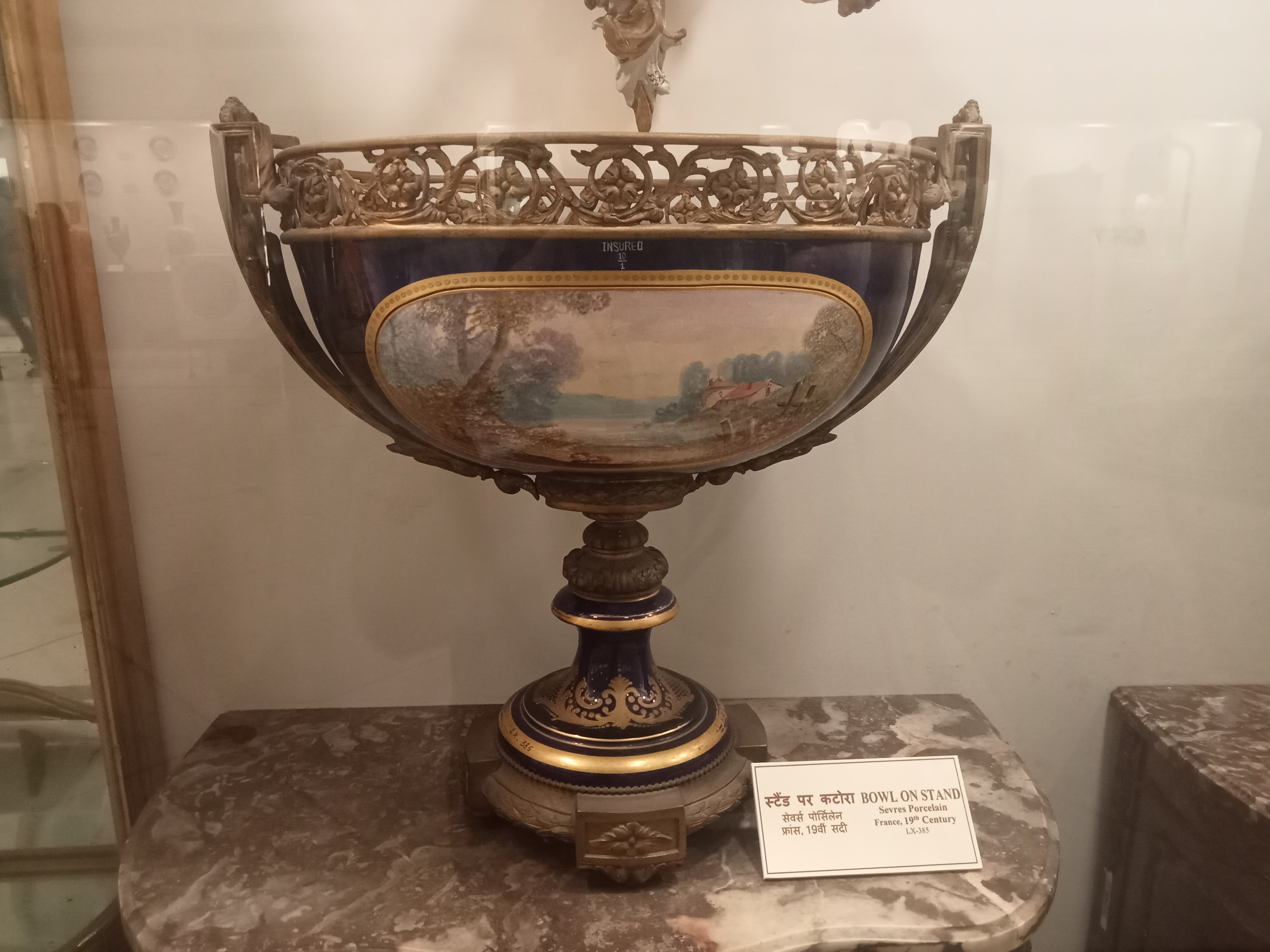
Porcelain vase from Sèvres, Salar Jung Museum in Hyderabad, India

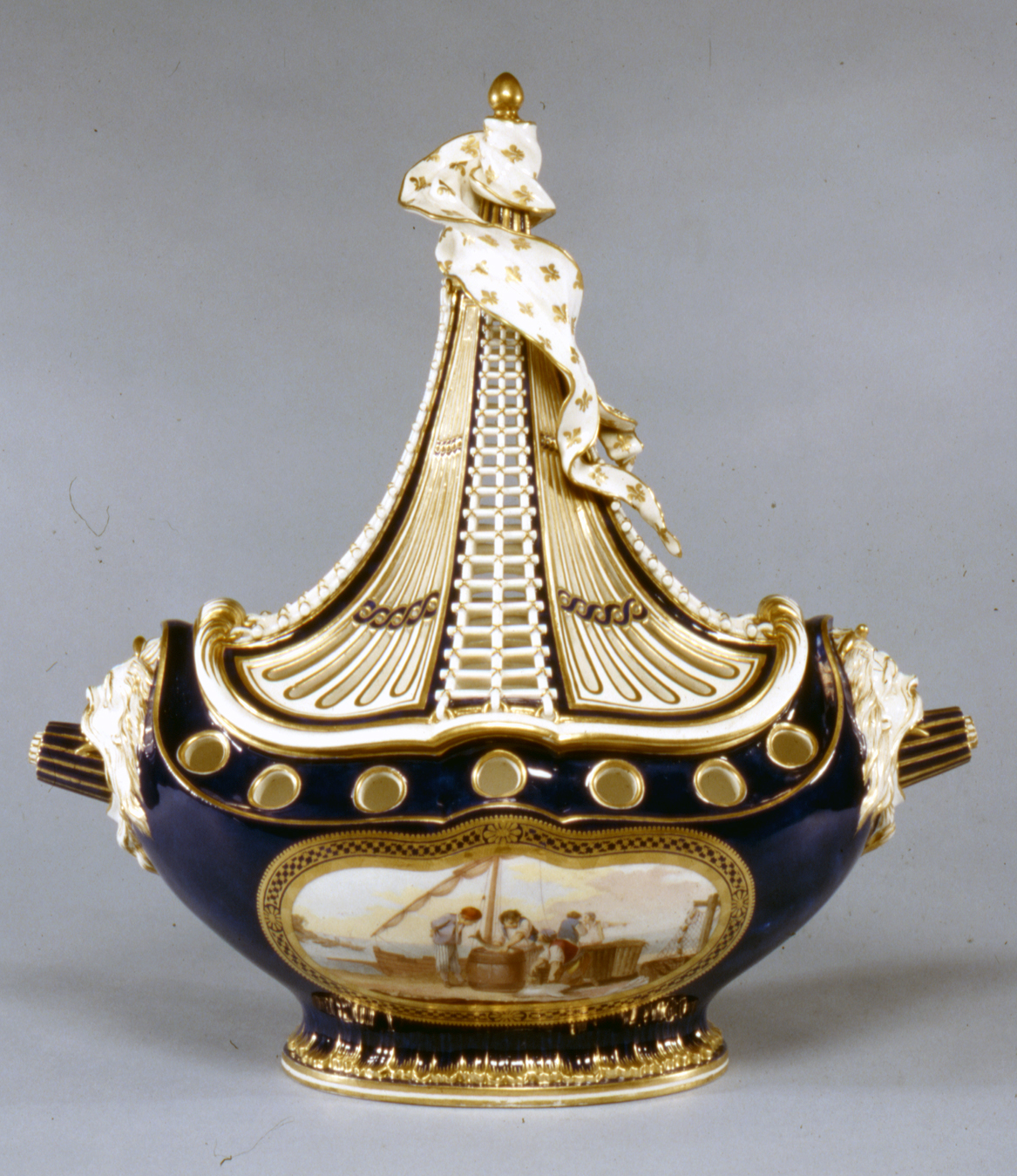
Sèvres pot-pourri vase in the shape of a ship, or Vase à vaisseau, 1764. One of the most famous shapes, of which only 10 examples survive.

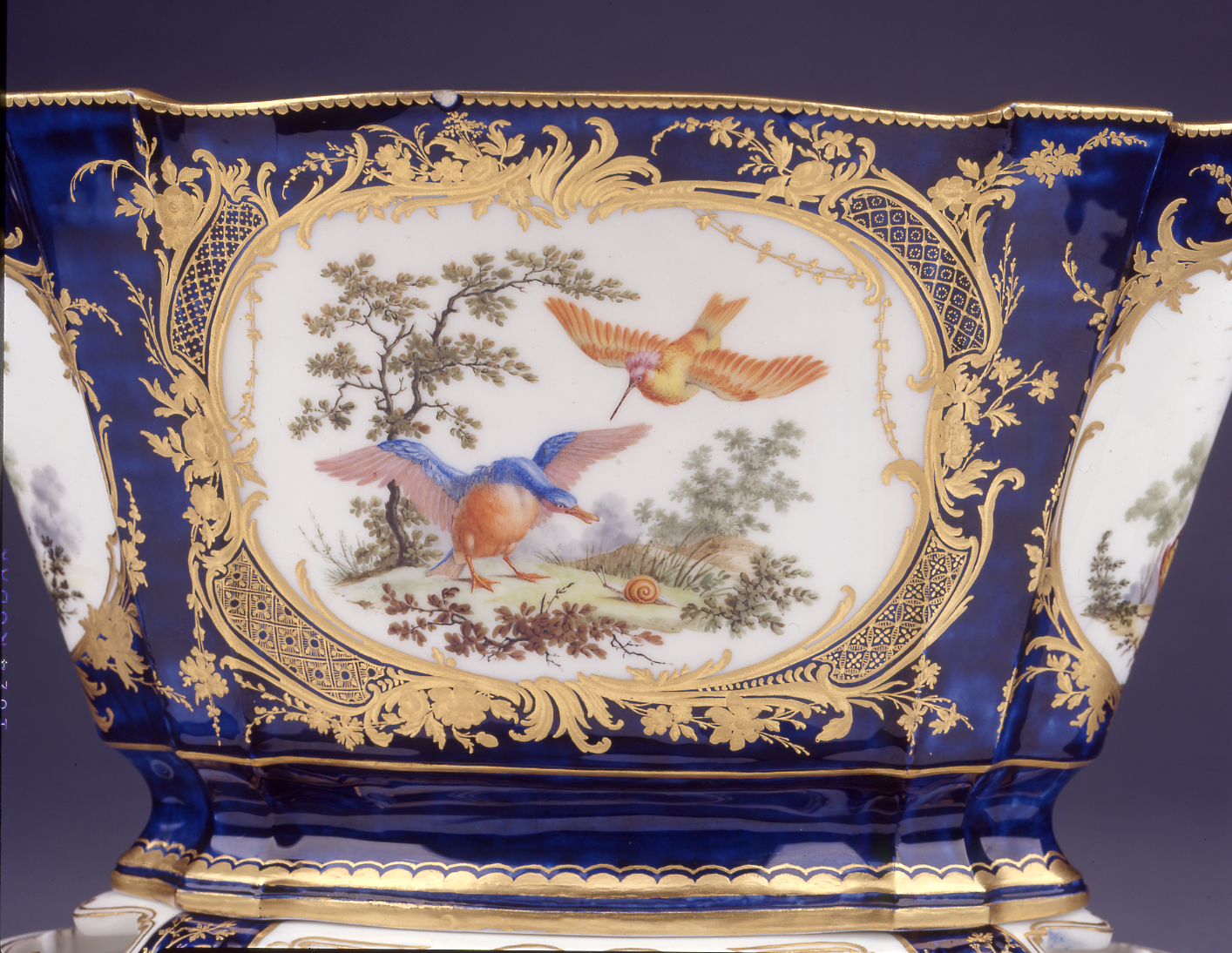
Fan-shaped jardinière and stand, 1758 at Waddesdon Manor

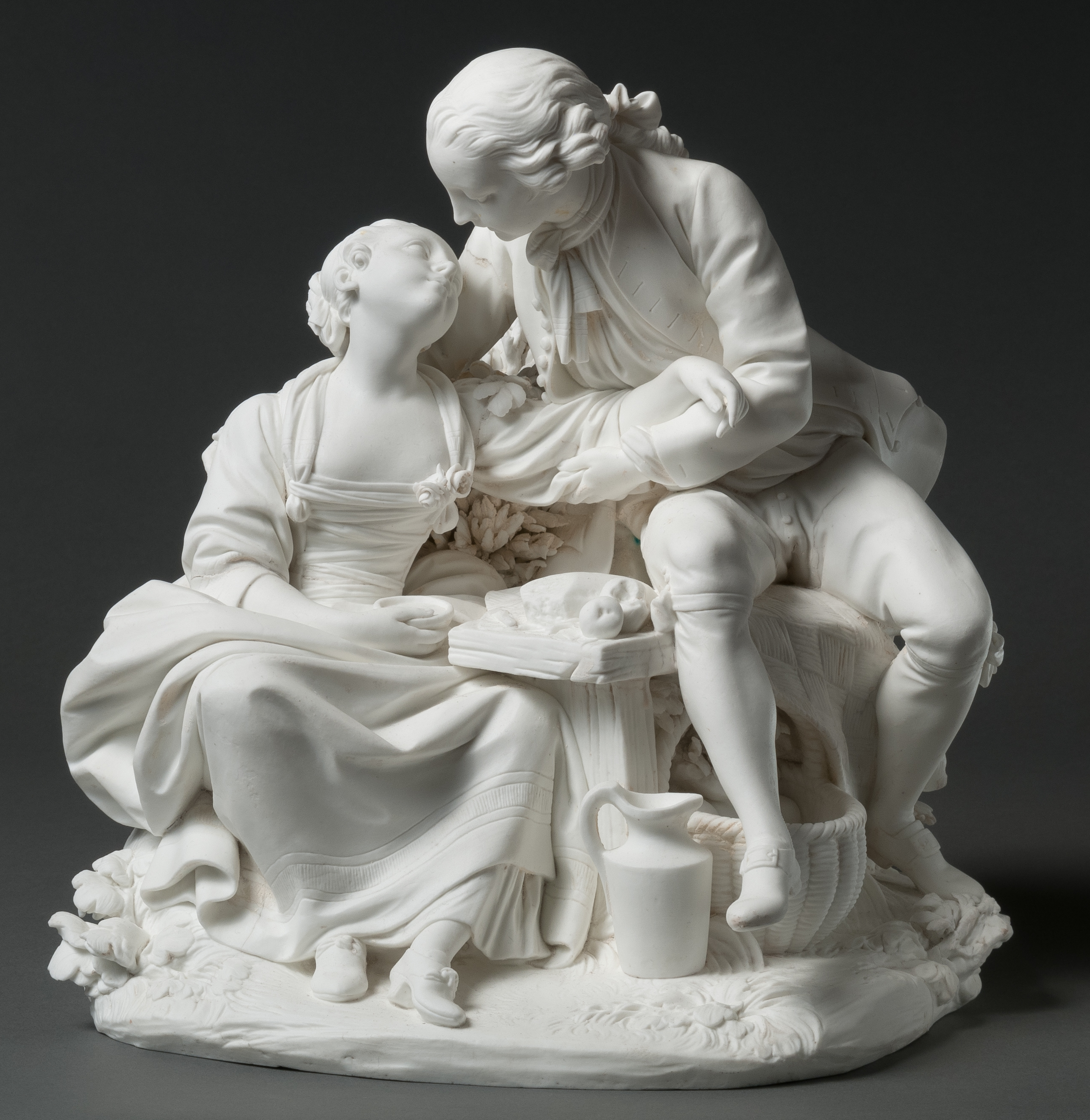
Annette and Lubin, biscuit porcelain, c. 1764 at Waddesdon Manor

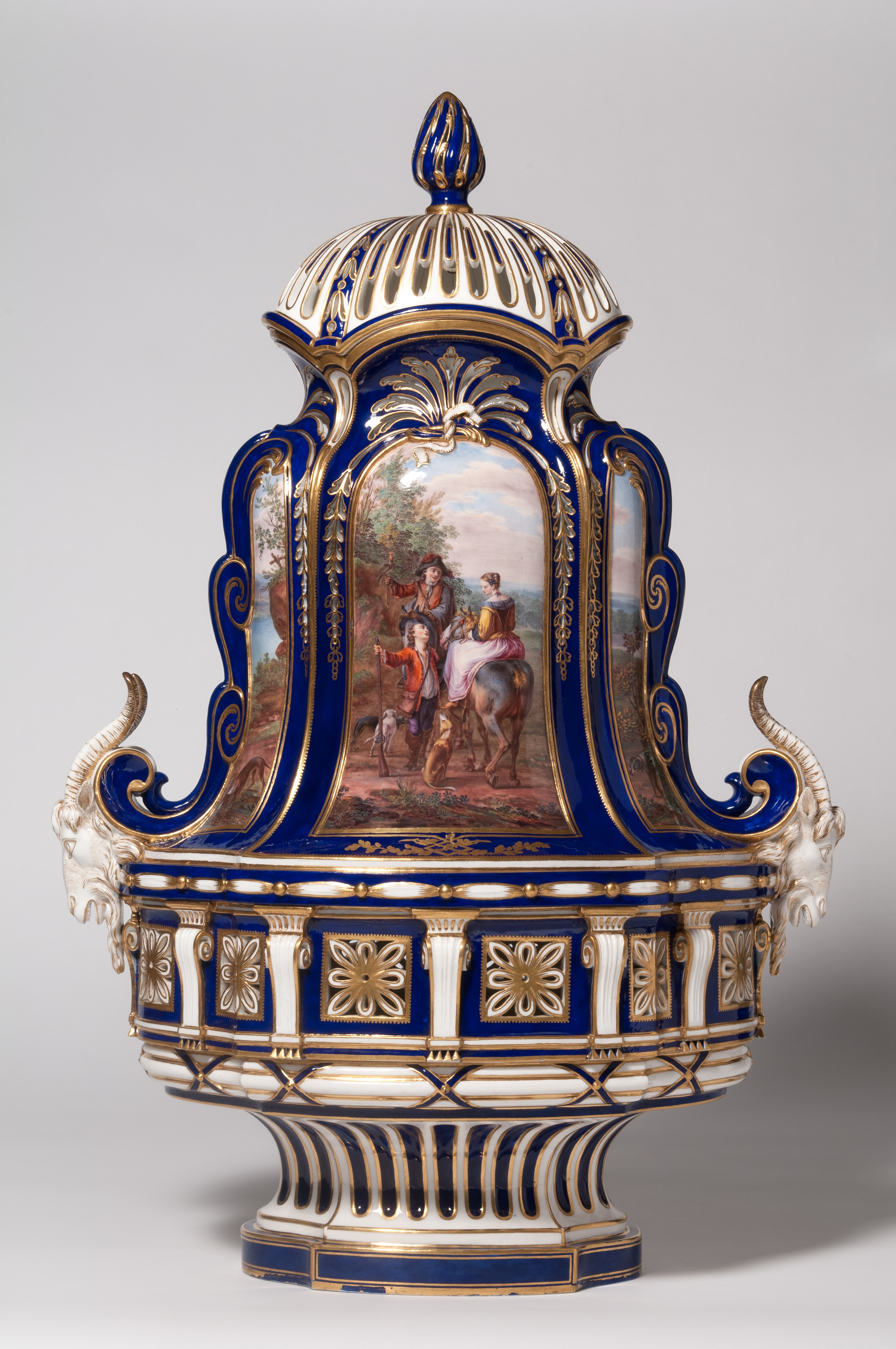
Pot-pourri vase, 1763 at Waddesdon Manor

Sèvres sucrier and cover – sugar pot, Bouret shape – c. 1770

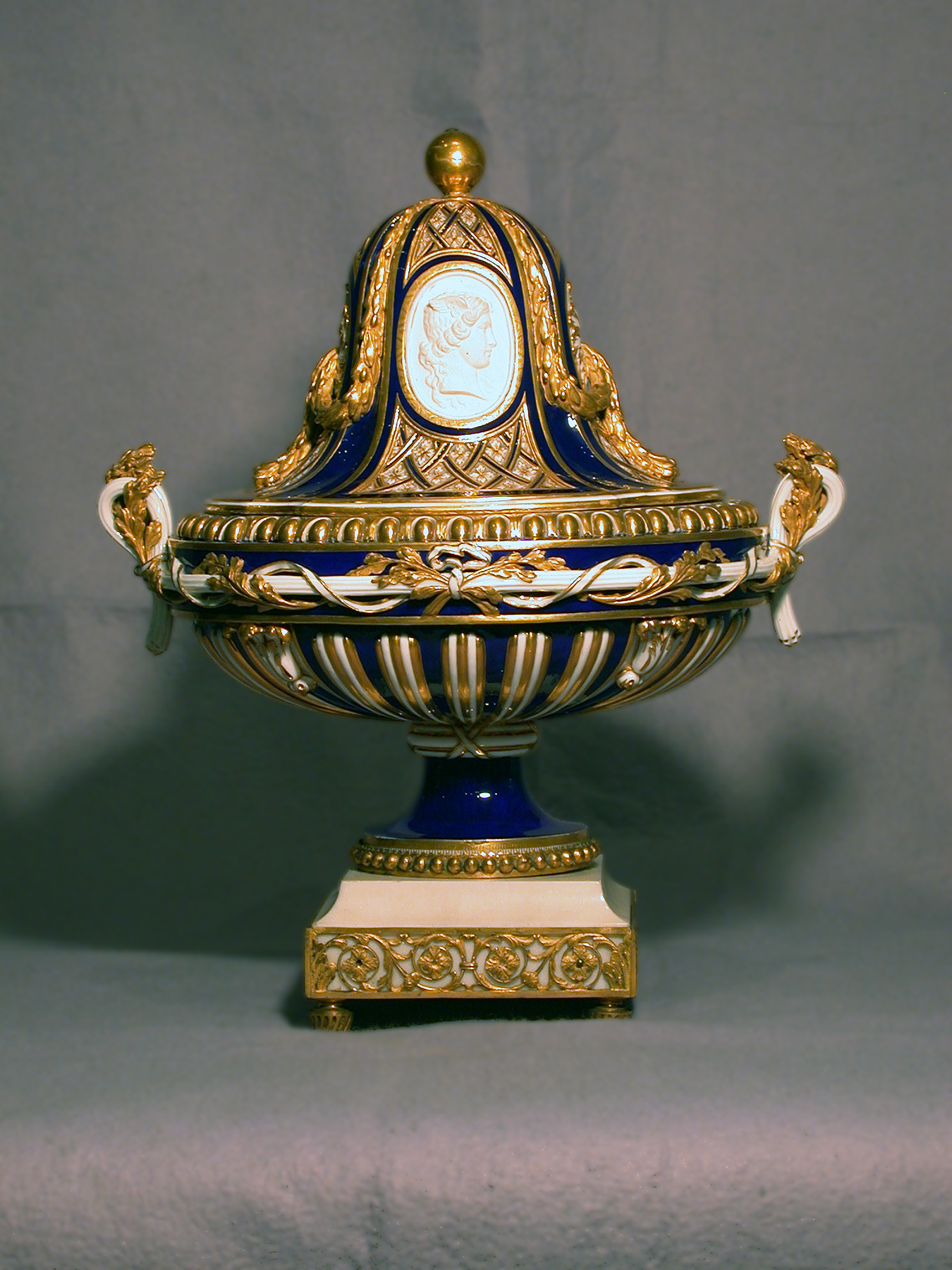
Potpourri vase ovale Mercure in early Neoclassical taste, c. 1770 (Walters Art Museum)

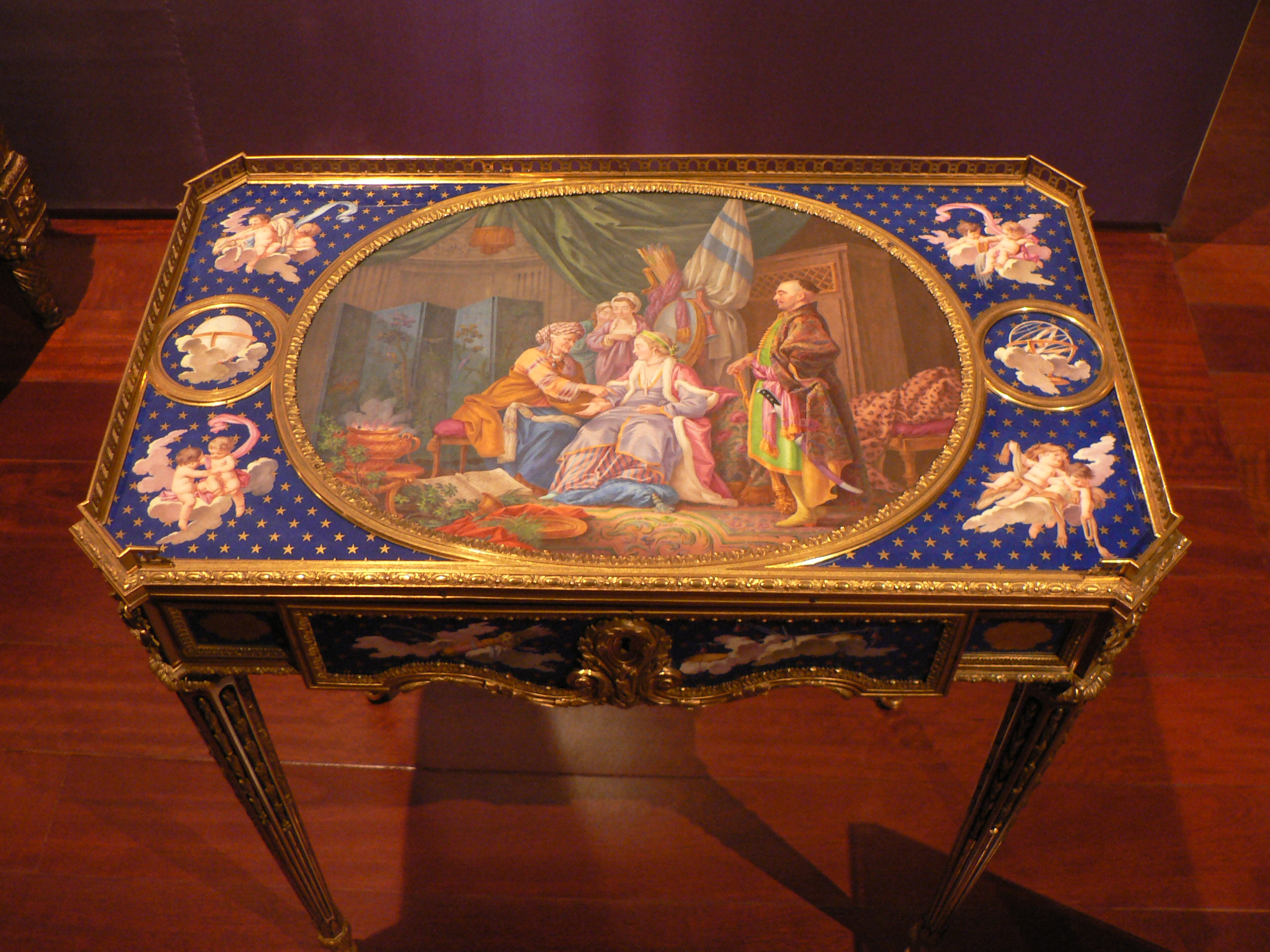
Writing table with porcelain plaques inset (Museu Calouste Gulbenkian, 1772)

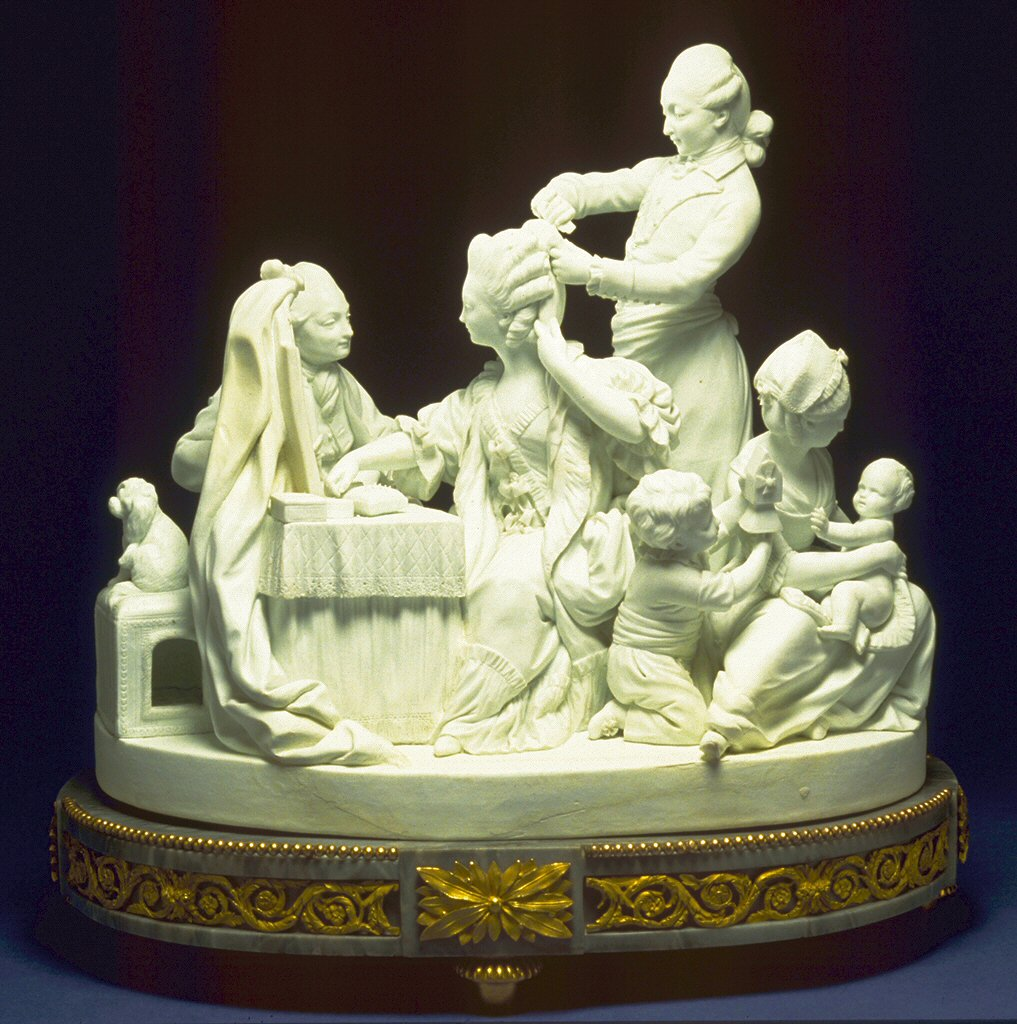
The Toilet of Madame: Hard-paste porcelain, marble, ormolu base, 1775, a domestic scene from upper-class life

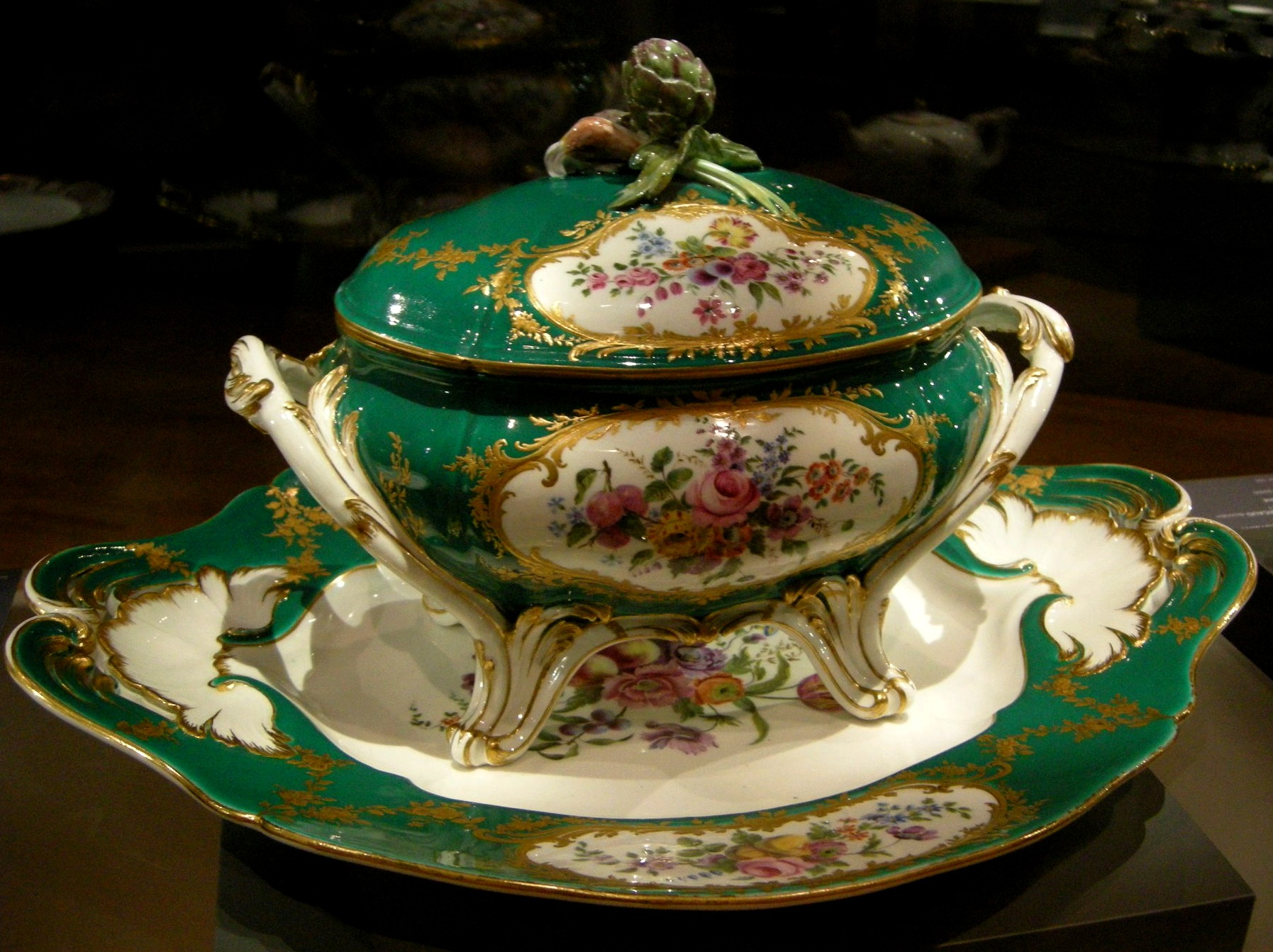
Tureen by Jacques-François Micaud (1732/1735–1811), National Gallery of Victoria, Australia

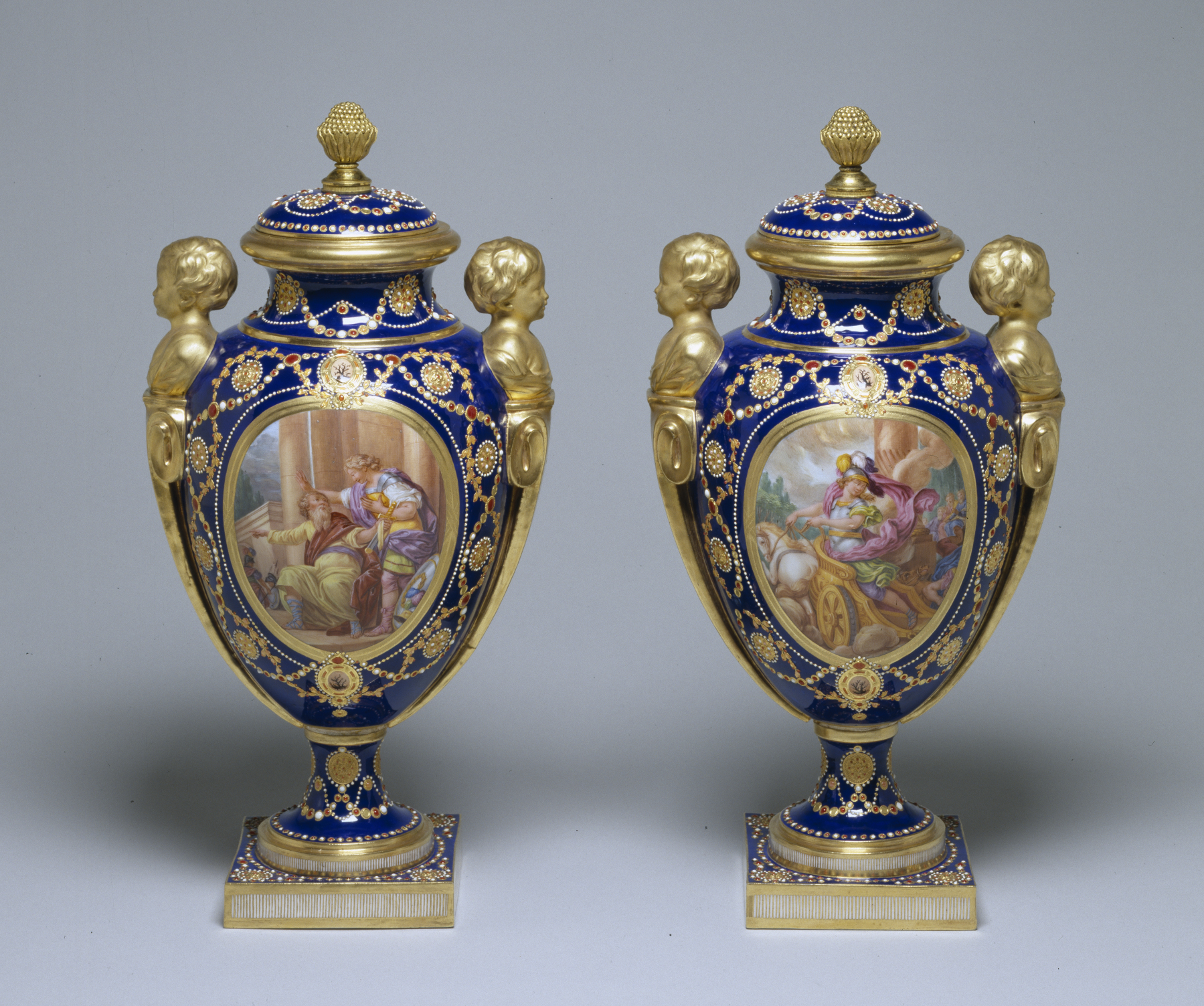
Vases made for Louis XVI, 1778–1782

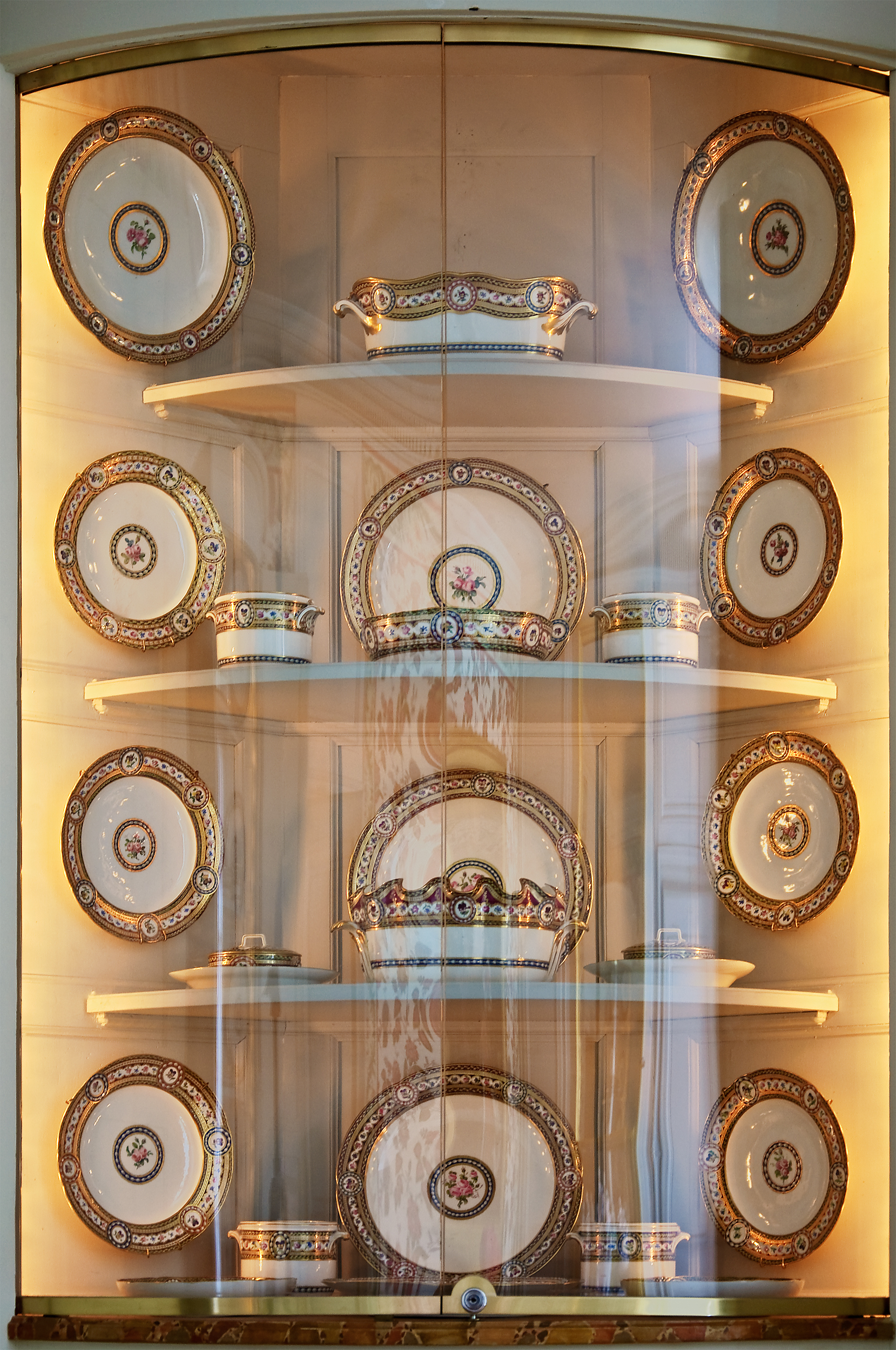
Pieces of a service "with decoration rich in colours and rich in gold" produced by the manufactory for Queen Marie Antoinette in 1784

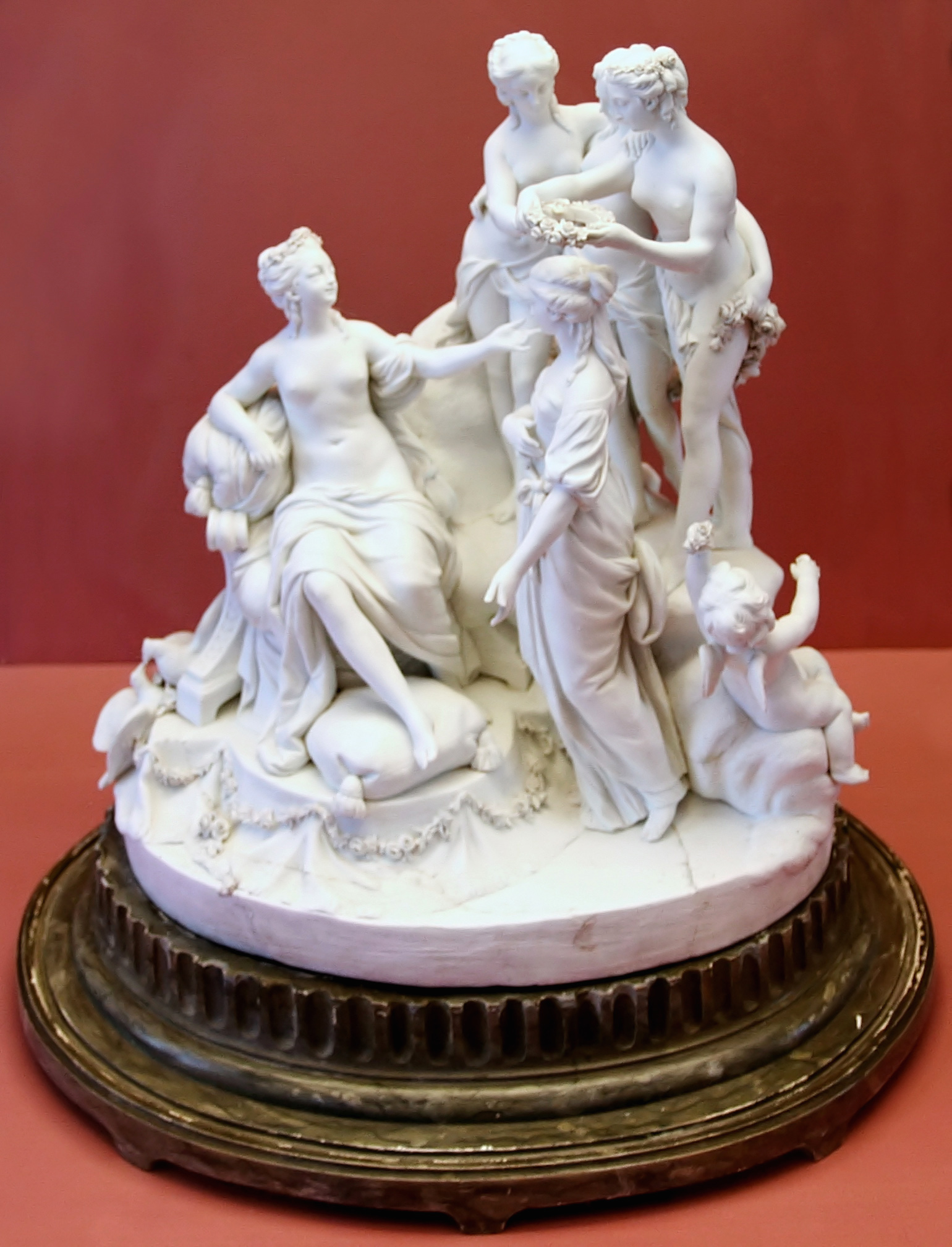
Figure of Venus crowning Beauty (Louvre, end of the 18th century)

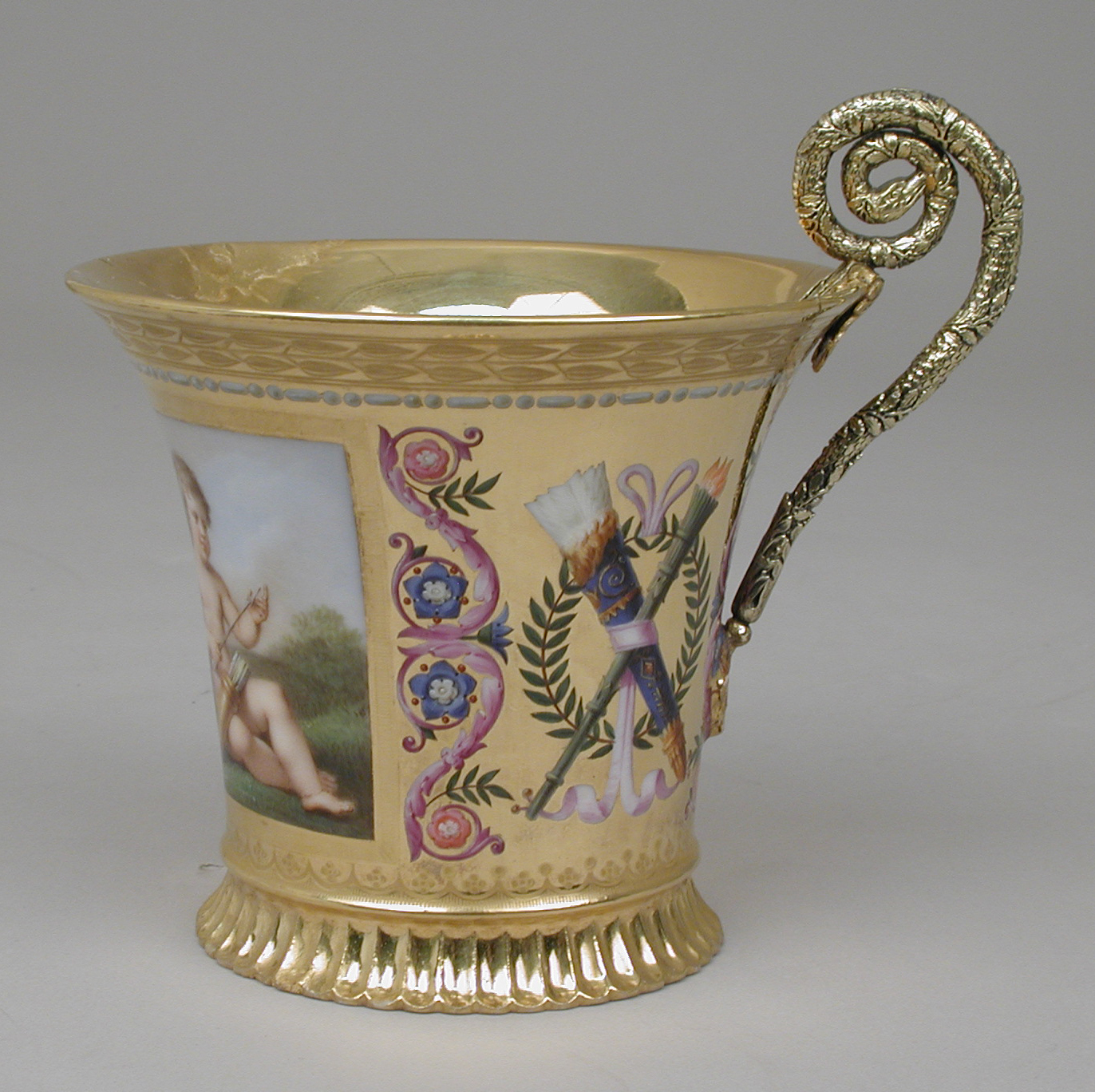
Empire style cup with silver handle from a breakfast service

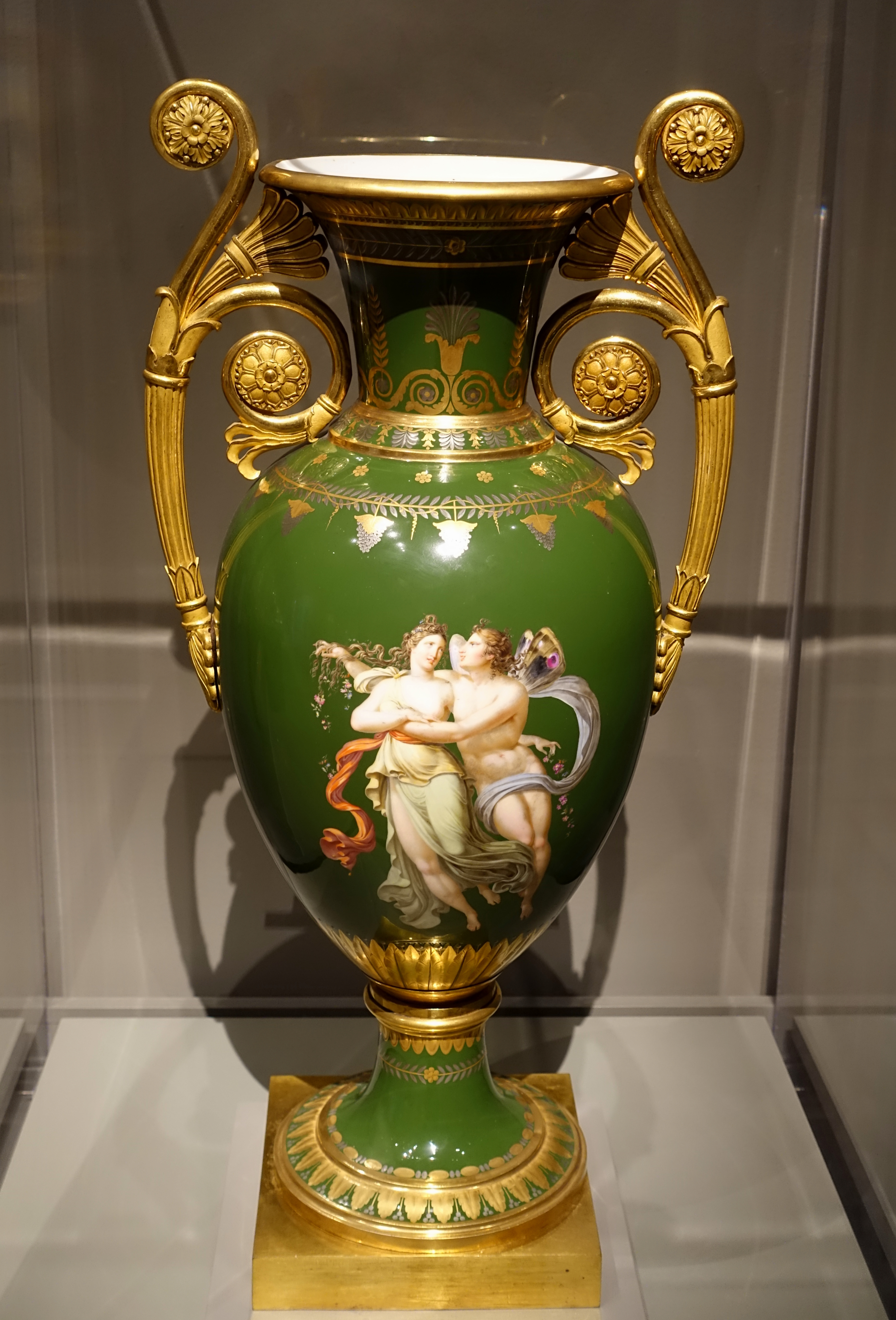
One of a pair of vases, 1809

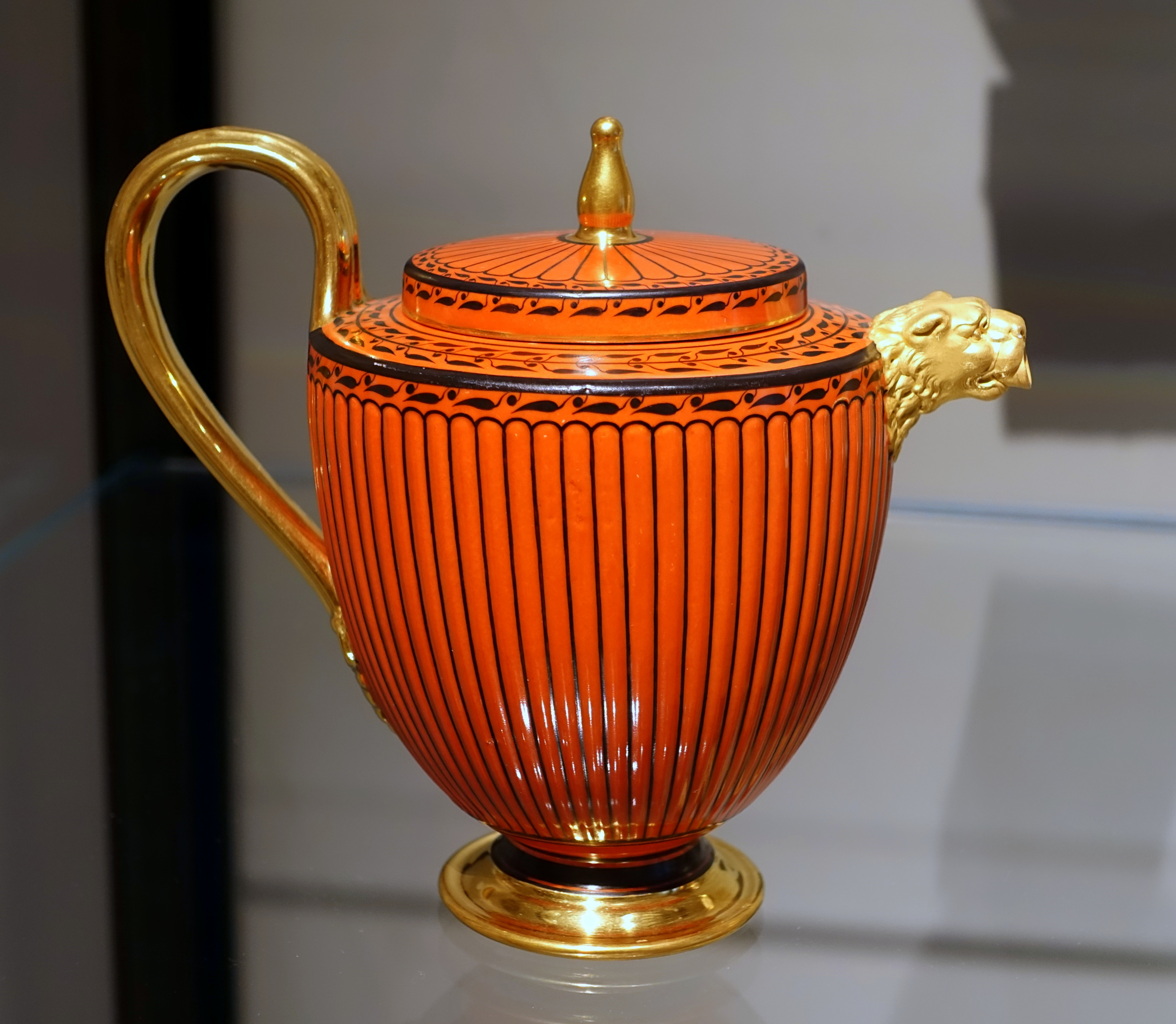
Teapot, 1817

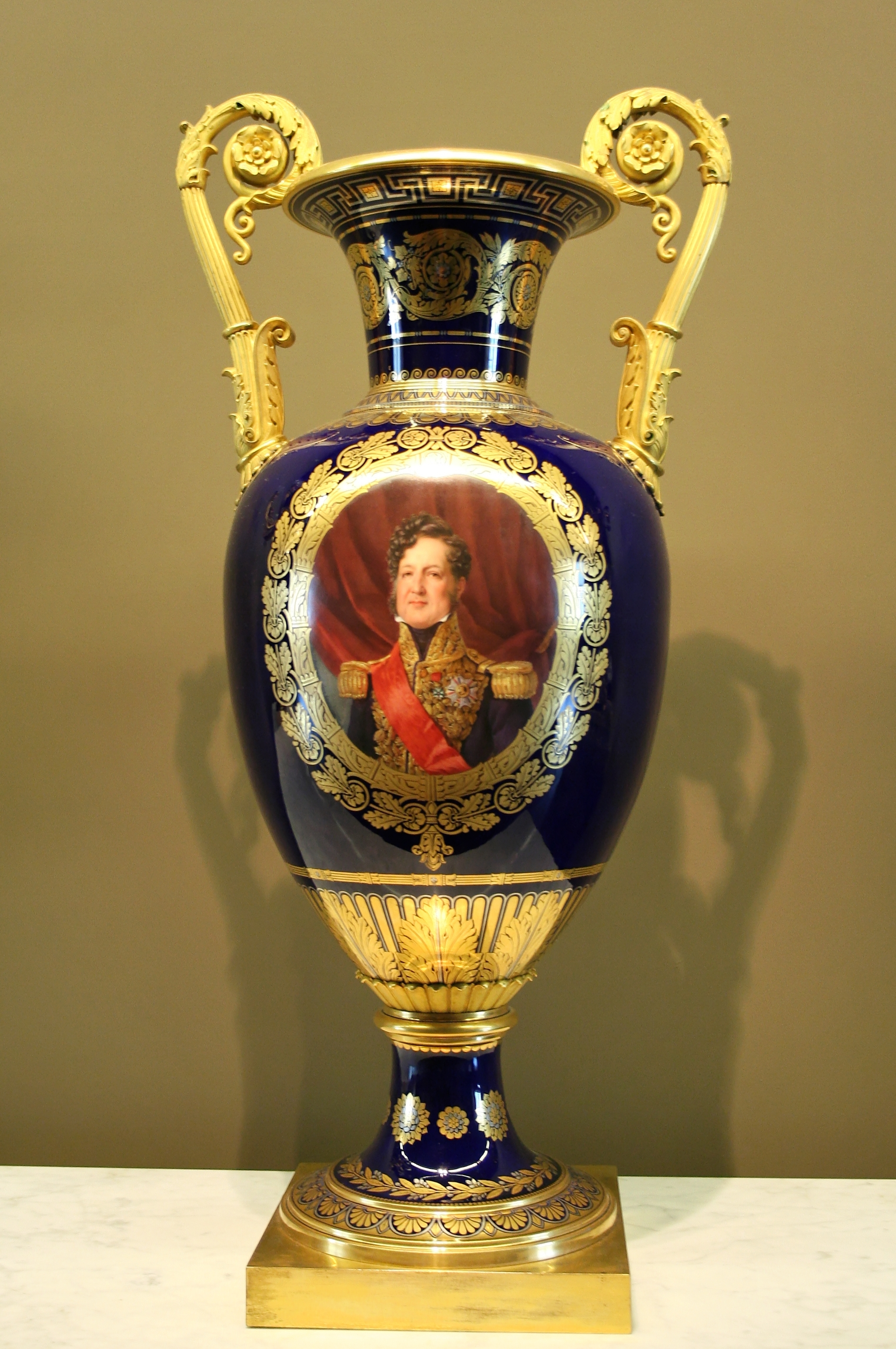
Vase depicting Louis-Philippe I (Louvre, 1837)

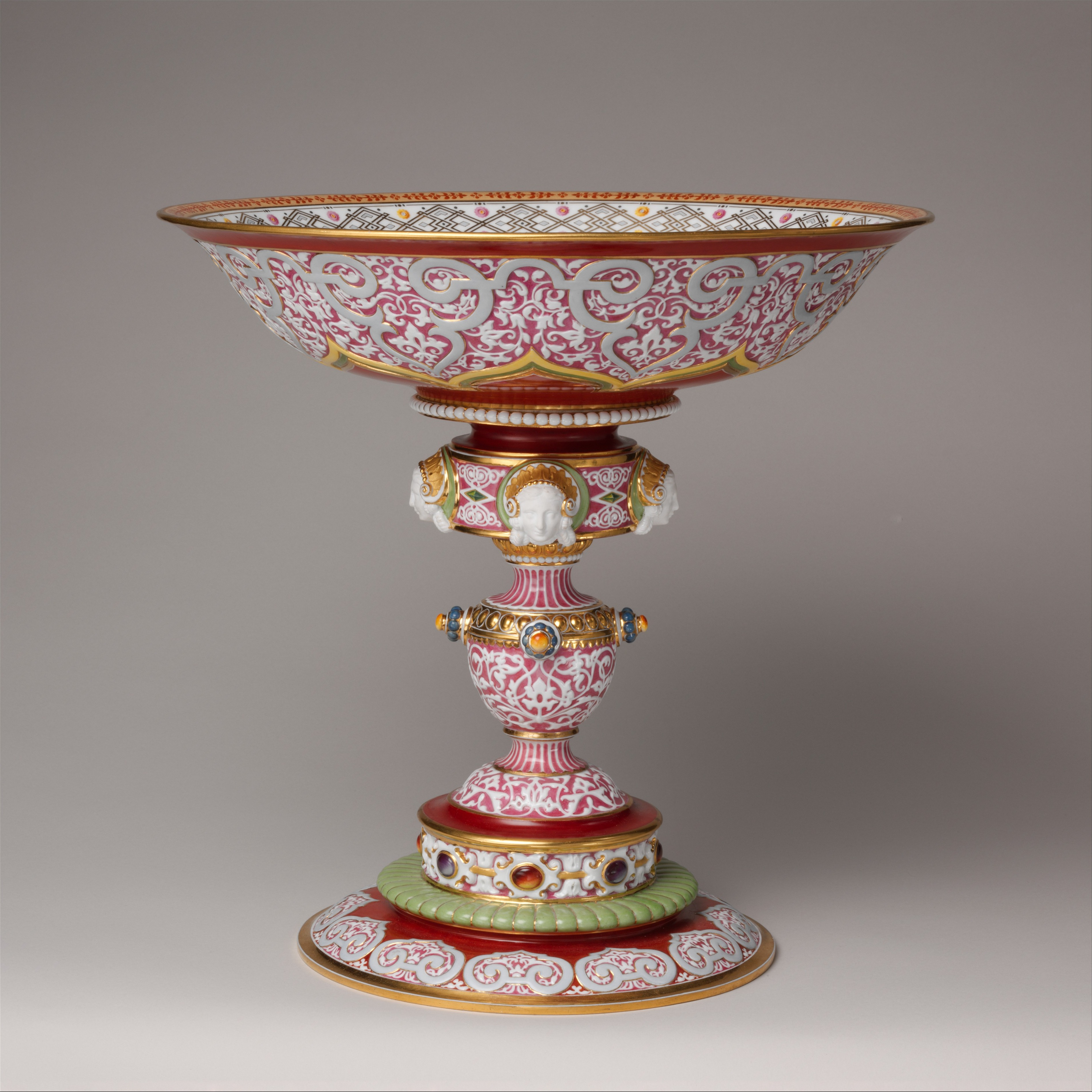
Cup, 1837, imitating Renaissance metalwork and Limoges enamel

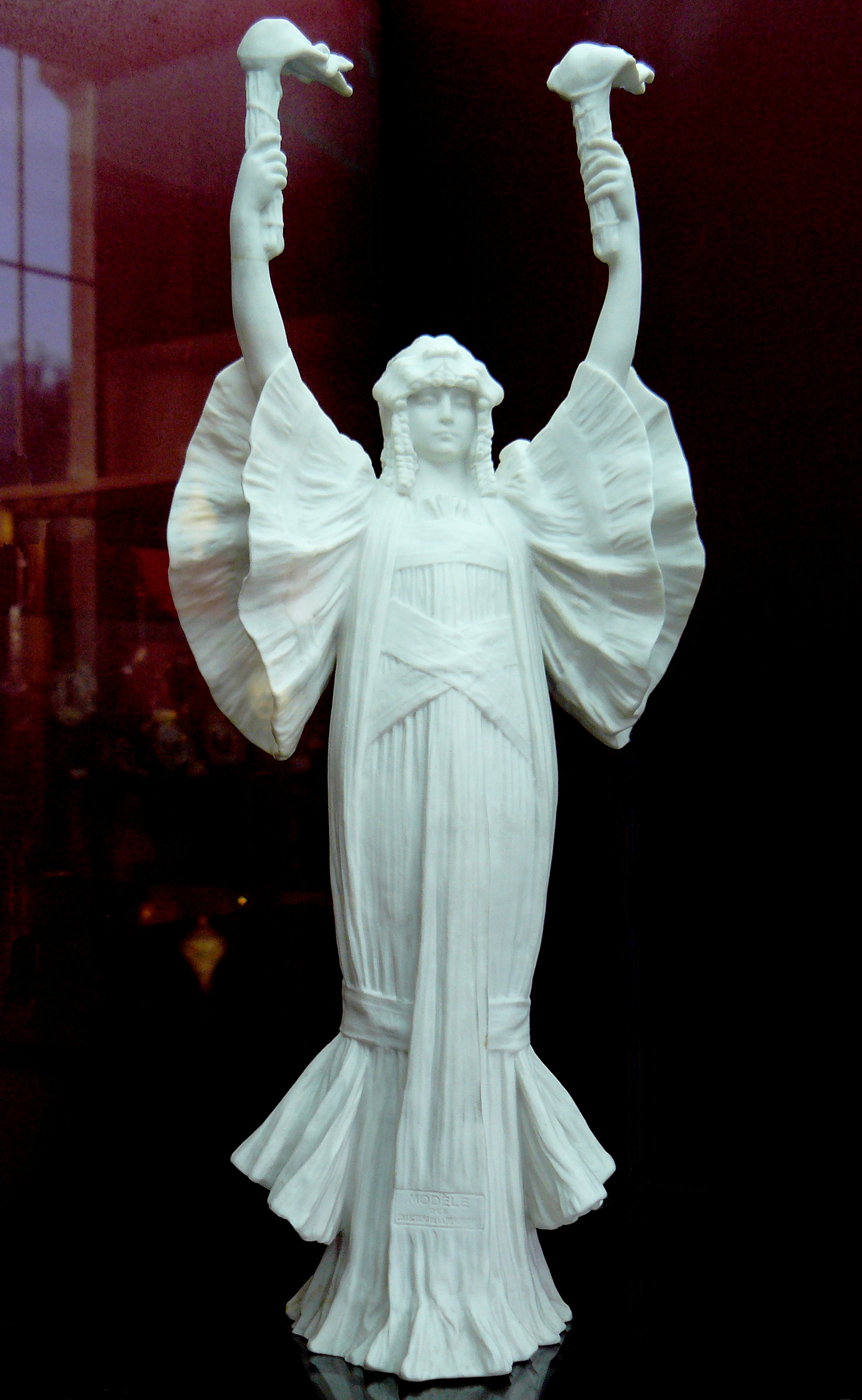
Figure in biscuit, for the Paris Exposition Universelle (1900)

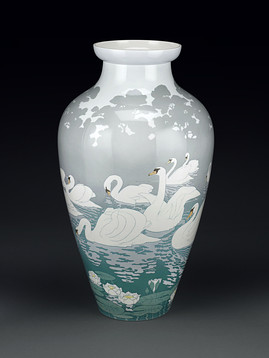
Swan vase, for the Paris Exposition Universelle (1900)

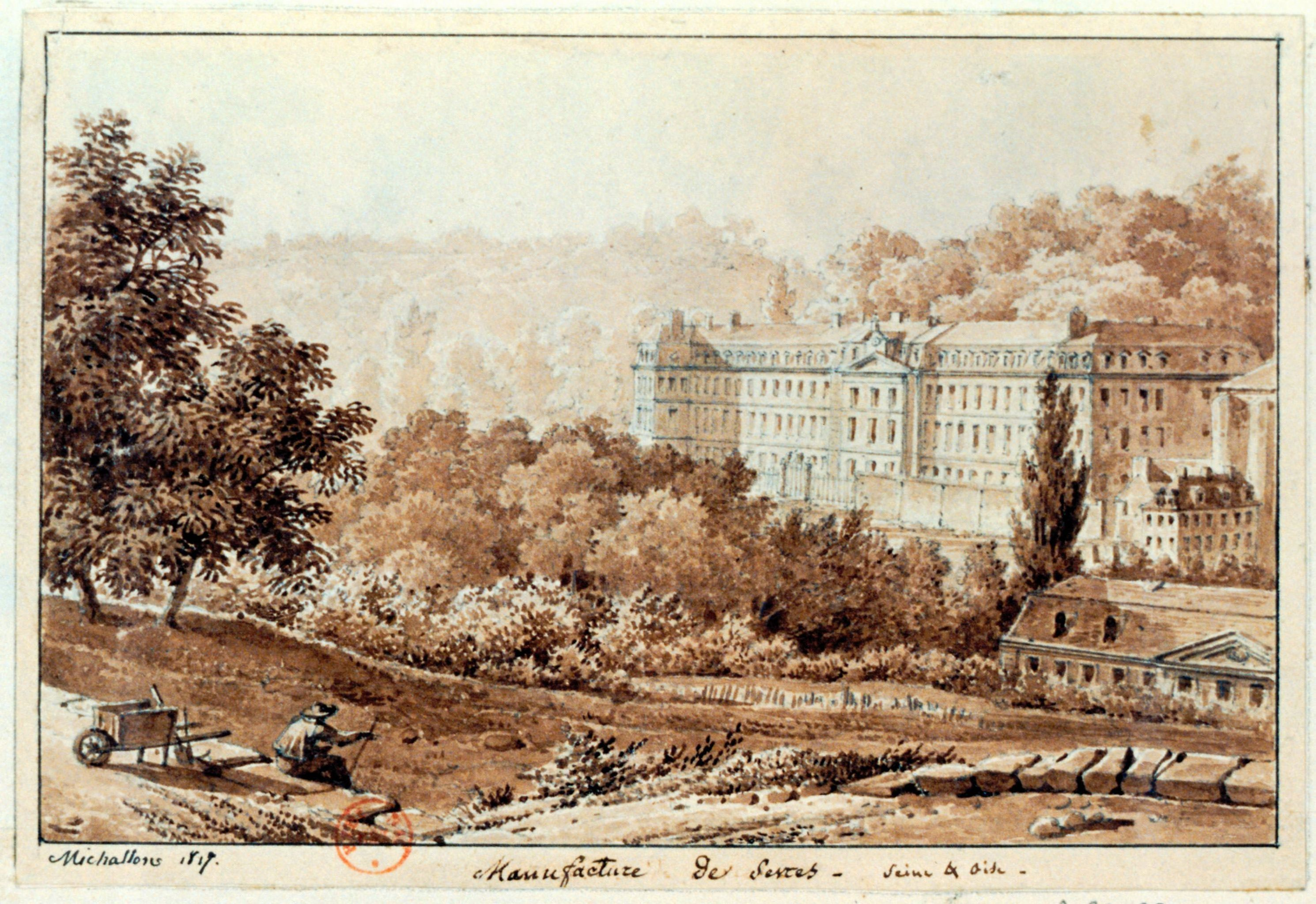
Manufacture de Sèvres in 1817 (not the current building), by Achille-Etna Michallon

== See also ==
- Sèvres - Cité de la céramique
- Porcelain manufacturing companies in Europe
- Sèvres Egyptian Service

== Bibliography ==
- Battie, David, ed., Sotheby's Concise Encyclopedia of Porcelain, 1990, Conran Octopus. ISBN 1850292515
- Georges Lechevallier-Chevignard, La Manufacture de porcelaine de Sèvres : histoire, organisation, ateliers, musée céramique, répertoire des marques et monogrammes d'artistes, Paris, le Livre d'histoire, 2013, Online at
- Tamara Préaud et Guilhem Scherf (ed.), La manufacture des lumières. La sculpture à Sèvres de Louis XV à la Révolution, [Exhibition Catalogue], Éditions Faton, 2015, ISBN 978-287844-206-9
- Zarucchi, Jeanne Morgan, "The Shepherdess' Progress: From Favart to Boucher to Sèvres," Konsthistorisk tidskrift (Journal of Art History), Vol. 85, No. 2 (2016), pp. 141–58.
