= Adrian Saxe =

American ceramic artist (born 1943)

- Born: 1943 (age 82–83); Glendale, California, U.S.
- Known for: Ceramic art
- Awards: Guggenheim Foundation Fellowship, National Endowment for the Arts Fellowship
- Website: http://www.adriansaxe.com/

Adrian Saxe is an American ceramic artist who was born in Glendale, California in 1943. He lives and works in Los Angeles, California.

== Biography ==
Saxe studied at the Chouinard Art Institute (Los Angeles, California) from 1965 to 1969 and earned a B.F.A. degree at the California Institute of the Arts (Valencia, California). Saxe's early works were primarily site-specific sculpture that employed large arrays of modular ceramic sections. Later, he turned to producing ornate vessels.

He has produced work for major solo and group exhibitions around the world and in 1983 he became the first artist fellow in residency at L’Atelier Experimental de Recherche et de Creation de la Manufacture Nationale de Sèvres in France. His work was the subject of a major mid-career survey organized by the Los Angeles County Museum of Art in 1993–94, which traveled to the Museum of Contemporary Art in Shigaraki, Japan, and to the Newark Museum of Art in Newark, NJ.

In a 1993 review of Saxe's work, art critic Christopher Knight wrote: “With outrageous humor and unspeakable beauty, he makes intensely seductive objects that exploit traditional anthropomorphic qualities associated with ceramics. Having pressed the question of the utility of his own art in a post-industrial world, his work engages us in a dialogue about our own place in a radically shifting cultural universe. The result is that Saxe has become the most significant ceramic artist of his generation.”

Saxe is currently a professor in the Art Department at the University of California, Los Angeles.

== Museum collections ==
- Arizona State University Art Museum, Ceramics Research Center, Tempe, Arizona
- Brooklyn Museum of Art, Brooklyn, New York
- Canton Museum of Art, Canton, Ohio
- Carnegie Museum of Art, Institute and Carnegie Museum of Natural History, Pittsburgh, Philadelphia
- Cooper-Hewitt Museum Smithsonian Institution, National Museum of Design, New York
- Cultural Affairs Commission, County of Los Angeles, California
- Currier Museum of Art, Manchester, New Hampshire
- de Young Museum, San Francisco, California
- Everson Museum of Art, Syracuse, New York
- Gardiner Museum, Ontario, Canada
- Kruithuis Museum, 's-Hertogenbosch, Netherlands
- Long Beach Museum of Art, Long Beach, California
- Los Angeles County Museum of Art, Los Angeles, California
- The Metropolitan Museum of Art, New York
- The Mint Museum, Charlotte, North Carolina
- Musée des Arts Décoratifs, Pavilion de Marsan, Palais de Louvre, Paris
- Musée National de Céramique de Sèvres, Sèvres, France
- Museum of Arts and Design, New York
- Museum of Fine Arts, Houston, Texas
- National Gallery of Australia, Canberra, Australia
- Nelson-Atkins Museum of Art, Kansas City, Missouri
- Nerman Museum of Contemporary Art, Overland Park, Kansas
- Newark Museum, Newark, New Jersey
- Nora Eccles Harrison Museum, Logan, Utah
- Oakland Museum of California, Oakland, California
- Racine Art Museum, Racine, Wisconsin
- Renwick Gallery, National Collection of American Art, Smithsonian Institution, Washington, D.C.
- Rhode Island School of Design Museum of Art, Providence, Rhode Island
- Shigaraki Ceramic Cultural Park, Shigaraki, Japan
- Taipei Fine Arts Museum, Taiwan, R.O.C.
- The Toledo Museum of Art, Toledo, Ohio
- Victoria and Albert Museum, London, England
- The White House Collection of American Crafts, Washington, D.C.

== Solo exhibitions ==
- GRIN—Genetic Robotic Information Nano (Technologies), Frank Lloyd Gallery, Santa Monica, California, 2011
- New Work, Frank Lloyd Gallery, Santa Monica, California, 2004
- Garth Clark Gallery, New York, New York, 2000
- The American Hand, Washington, D.C., 1998
- Wish I may, Wish I might, Frank Lloyd Gallery, Santa Monica, California, Garth Clark Gallery, New York, 1997
- Garth Clark Gallery, New York, New York, 1996
- Garth Clark Gallery, Los Angeles, California, 1995
- Garth Clark Gallery, New York, New York, 1994
- The Clay Art of Adrian Saxe, Los Angeles County Museum of Art traveled to the Museum of Contemporary Ceramic Art, Shigaraki, Japan and Newark Museum, New Jersey (1993–1995)
- Garth Clark Gallery, New York, New York, 1992
- Garth Clark Gallery, Los Angeles, California, 1991
- Garth Clark Gallery, Kansas City, Missouri, 1991
- Garth Clark Gallery, New York, New York, 1990
- Garth Clark Gallery, Los Angeles, California, 1989
- Garth Clark Gallery, New York, New York, 1988
- Art Gallery, University of Missouri, Kansas City, Missouri, 1987
- Garth Clark Gallery, New York, New York, 1987
- Garth Clark Gallery, Los Angeles, California, 1985
- The American Hand, Washington, D.C., 1985
- Garth Clark Gallery, New York, New York, 1985
- Garth Clark Gallery, New York, New York, 1983
- The American Hand, Washington, D.C., 1983
- Thomas Segal Gallery, Boston, Massachusetts, 1983
- Garth Clark Gallery, Los Angeles, California, 1982
- The American Hand, Washington, D.C., 1982
- The American Hand, Washington, D.C., 1980
- The American Hand, Washington, D.C., 1979
- The American Hand, Washington, D.C., 1973
- Canyon Gallery II, Los Angeles, California, 1970
