= Abraham Constantin =

Swiss enamel painter

Abraham Constantin (1 December 1785 – 10 March 1855), a Swiss enamel painter, was born at Geneva. He became a pupil of Gérard, after whom he executed many works in enamel and on porcelain, among which may be mentioned, 'Belisarius,' 'Cupid and Psyche,' 'The Entry of Henry IV. into Paris,' and portraits of the King of Rome, Charles X, and the Emperor of Russia. He was attached to the manufactory at Sèvres, and died at Geneva.

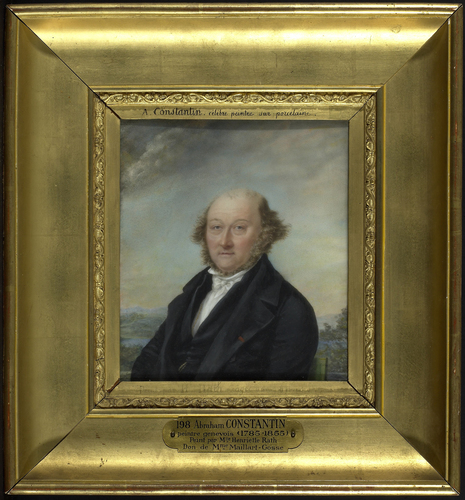
Abraham Constantin 1847

Rue Abraham Constantin in Geneva is named after him with the following information:

Son of Jacob and Elisabeth Rival. Abraham Constantin (1785–1855) studied at College then at the drawing school of the Société des Arts, pupil of Constant Vaucher. He was apprenticed to the enamellers Henri L'Evêque, Jean-Martin Dufour, Richard, Léchaud and Jean-Jacques Soutter. He was a talented painter. In Paris from 1807, he was a protégé of Baron Desnoyer and François Gérard, Constantine was introduced to the Empress Joséphine. The leading painter at the Sèvres factory, where he worked from 1813. He was sent to Florence (1820–1825) where he made copies after Raphaël. He was Porcelain painter to the King of France in 1826, he ran a school from 1828. He lived in Rome from 1830 to 1844. During his time he enjoyed international fame, due to an excellent profession and a good understanding of the works reproduced. Friend of Stendhal, who annotated his "Italian Ideas on some famous paintings" (1840). He obtained the Legion of Honour in 1828. He died in 1855.
