= Suzanne Estelle Apoil =

French porcelain painter

- Born: Suzanne Estelle Béranger; 19 October 1825; Sèvres, France
- Died: 28 June 1902 (aged 76); Sèvres
- Known for: porcelain painting

Suzanne Estelle Apoil (19 October 1825 – 28 June 1902) was a French porcelain painter and watercolorist.

== Biography ==
Suzanne Estelle Apoil was the daughter of Antoine Béranger, a painter at the Manufactory of Sèvres and sister of the painters Charles Béranger and Jean-Baptiste Antoine Emile Béranger. She was the wife of the painter Charles Alexis Apoil (1809–1864). She studied with her father.

As a porcelain painter for the National Manufactory of Sèvres, she received a 3rd class medal at the Salon of 1846, and a 3nd class medal in the 1848 Salon. In 1874, the French government commissioned her to produce two vases, to be given to the Empress of all the Russias.

Apoil exhibited at the World's Columbian Exposition in Chicago, Illinois, in 1893.

She died 28 June 1902 and was buried at the Sèvres cemetery, beside the graves of her husband and her father.

== Collections ==
- Château de Dieppe
- Collection du Mobilier national, France
- Musée des arts décoratifs, Paris
- Musée national de Céramique
- Musée d'Orsay, Paris
- Réunion des Musées Nationaux Grand Palais, Sèvres
- Victoria and Albert Museum, London
