= Sèvres Egyptian Service =

Tableware set of the First French Empire

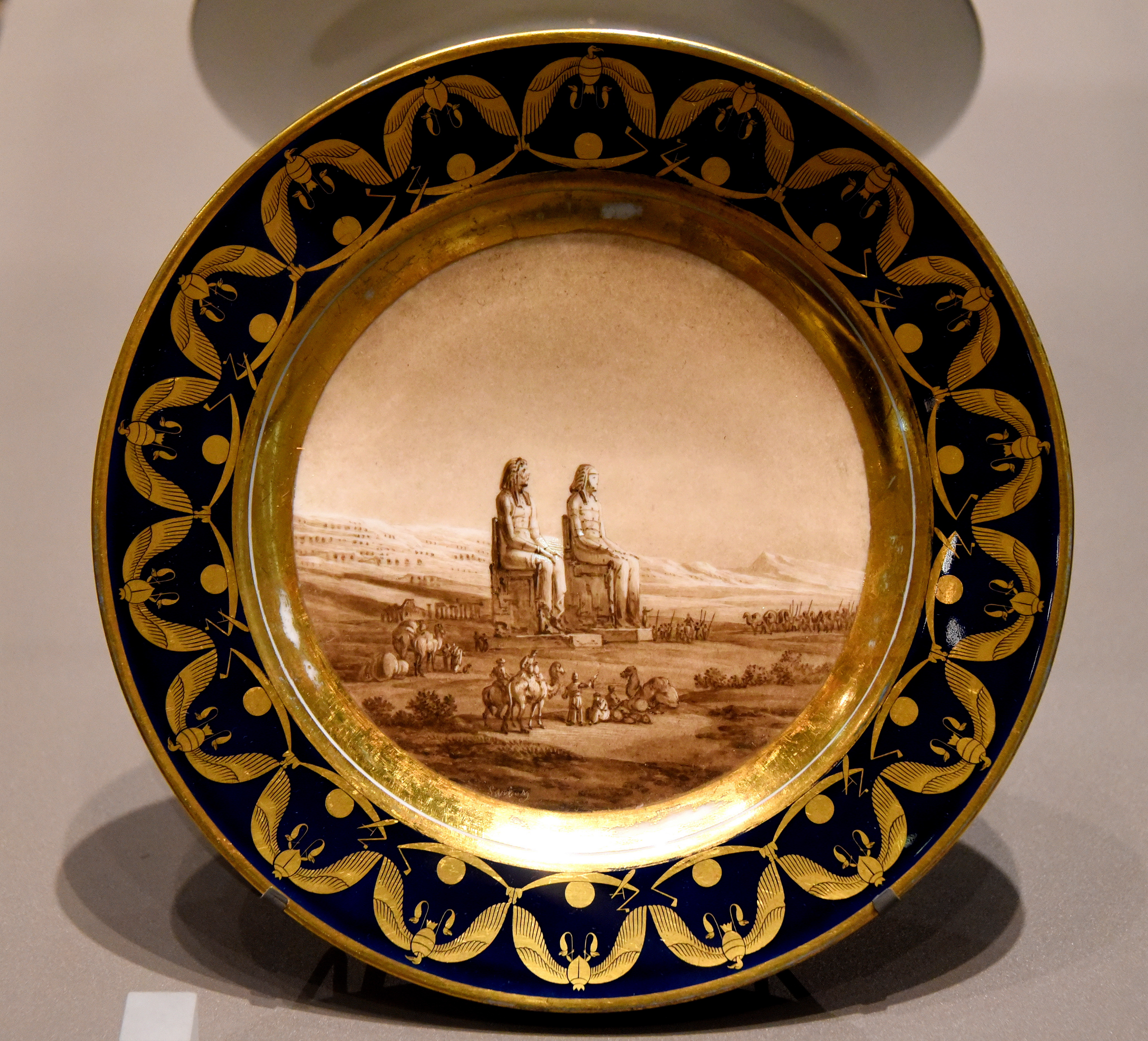
A plate of the second Sèvres Egyptian Service, depicting the Colossi of Memnon

The Sèvres Egyptian Service is a name used for two sets of tableware made by the Manufacture nationale de Sèvres during the First French Empire. The first was produced between 1804 and 1806 for Napoleon I and was presented by him to Alexander I of Russia in 1808, as a diplomatic gift following the Treaties of Tilsit. It is now held in the State Museum of Ceramics in Russia.

The second set was produced between 1810 and 1812. It was intended as a gift from Napoleon to Empress Joséphine. The service consisted of 72 plates with the wells depicting scenes from Egypt based on sketches made by Vivant Denon. Joséphine refused to accept the service, which she described as "too severe". It was returned to the factory and given as a gift to the Duke of Wellington by Louis XVIII in 1818, following the Bourbon Restoration. The service was purchased by the Victoria and Albert Museum in 1979 and, except for one plate, was loaned to English Heritage to display at Apsley House, London, the former residence of the first duke.

== Background and first edition ==
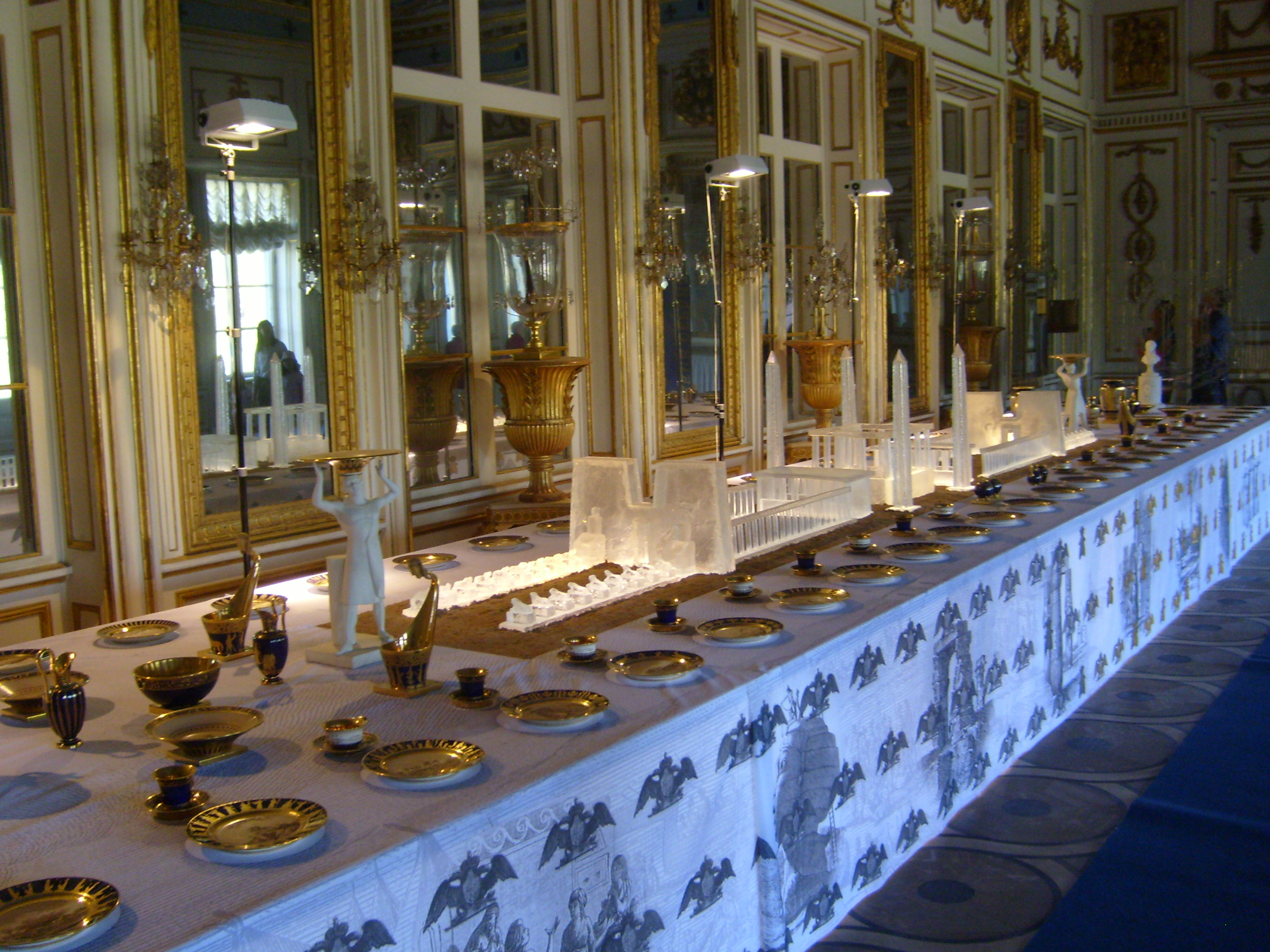
The Tsar Alexander Sèvres Egyptian Service and centrepiece

Napoleon, before becoming Emperor of France, had invaded Egypt in 1798. Although ultimately unsuccessful, Napoleon's invasion was culturally important. He brought a team of scholars and artists with him and their studies sparked a period of European interest in Egyptian culture, known as Egyptomania. Napoleon established the First French Empire in 1804 and, to enhance the prestige of the new regime, the Manufacture nationale de Sèvres was commissioned to produce a porcelain table service in the Egyptian style, painted by Jacques François Joseph Swebach-Desfontaines. Completed by 1806 the service was never used by Napoleon, and in 1808 he presented it as a gift to Alexander I of Russia after the Treaties of Tilsit between the two nations.

== Second edition ==
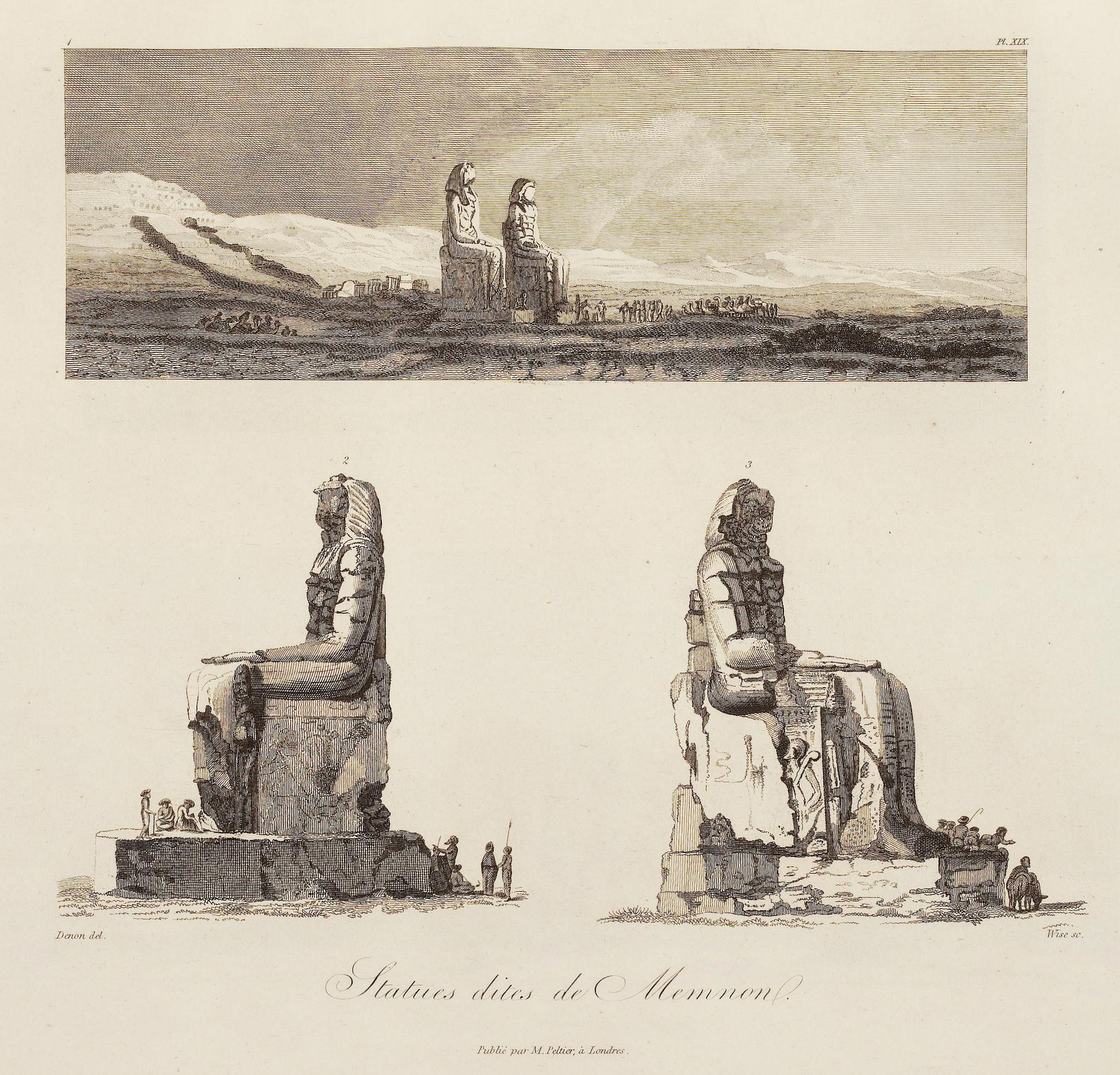
Drawing by Denon which was the basis for the Colossi plate

=== Commissioning ===
Napoleon divorced Empress Joséphine in 1810 and commissioned the Sèvres Egyptian Service, considered a second edition of the Alexander service, as a divorce gift. The service consisted of 72 plates (plus four extra or trial pieces) as well as an elaborate architectural centrepiece. Joséphine was involved in the design of the service but lost patience with the slow production rate. The wells of the plates were decorated with sketches made by Vivant Denon during the 1798 Egyptian campaign. The borders were designed by the architect Alexandre-Théodore Brongniart, father of the Sèvres factory owner, and the gilding was carried out by Pierre-Louis Micaud.

The service was delivered to Joséphine at the Château de Malmaison on 1 April 1812. She considered the design too severe and rejected the service, which was then valued at 36,300 francs.

=== Later history ===
The service was returned to the factory where it remained until 1818 when Louis XVIII, the restored Bourbon king, presented it to the British general the Duke of Wellington, for his services during the Napoleonic Wars. At that time only 66 plates remained with the service; three other plates were later located at the Musée national de Céramique-Sèvres and one, to a slightly different design and possibly a trial piece, at the British Museum. The Duke displayed the service at his Apsley House London residence where he showcased his most valuable treasures.

The service remained in the possession of the Dukes of Wellington until 1979 when it was purchased by the Victoria and Albert Museum (V&A), London. The V&A displays one plate from the collection, depicting the Colossi of Memnon, and loans the remainder to English Heritage which displays it at Apsley House. The first edition (Alexander I) service is displayed at the State Museum of Ceramics in Russia. Art historian Sir Roy Strong regarded the second edition service as "without doubt the grandest example of French porcelain to have survived from the Empire period".
