= Louis Jean Thévenet =

French porcelain painter

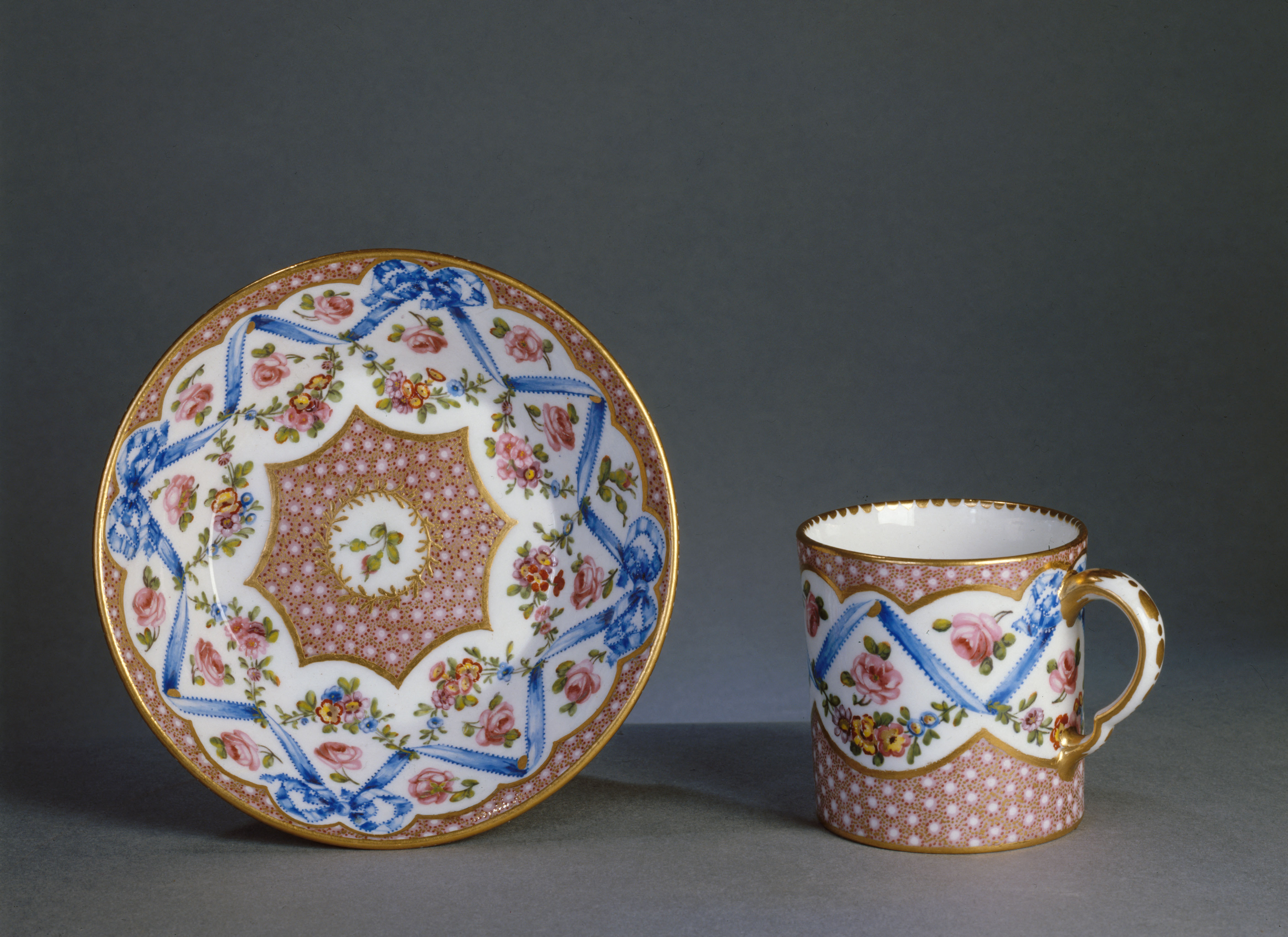
Cup and saucer, Sèvres, 1774. Musée Cognacq-Jay

Jean Louis Thevenet le père (French: [lwi ʒɑ̃ tevənɛ]; 1705 – ca. 1778) was a French porcelain painter active from 1741 to 1777. Formerly a fanmaker, he painted flowers, both singular and in bunches. His early work included painting on porcelain in the studio of Louis François Gravant. He worked at Manufacture de Vincennes (1741) before joining Sèvres in 1756 where he was known as No. 121. (Note: One of his sons is No. 122, the latter specializing in ornaments and friezes) His mark resembles a pin, although it has also been illustrated as a comma or musical note. He was known to still have painted in 1778, and to have had a daughter who also painted for Sèvres.

== Selected works in public collections ==
- 1764, ointment jars, Sèvres porcelain, polychrome decoration, Museum of Fine Arts, Boston
- 1767, bone china cup and saucer, Clark Art Institute
- 1768, cup and saucer from the Manufacture de Vincennes, Musée des Arts Décoratifs, Paris
- Sugar pot, Walters Art Museum
