= Bronze Horseman =

Monument for Peter I at the Senate Square in Saint Petersburg

Coordinates: 59.9364°N 30.3022°E

The Bronze Horseman
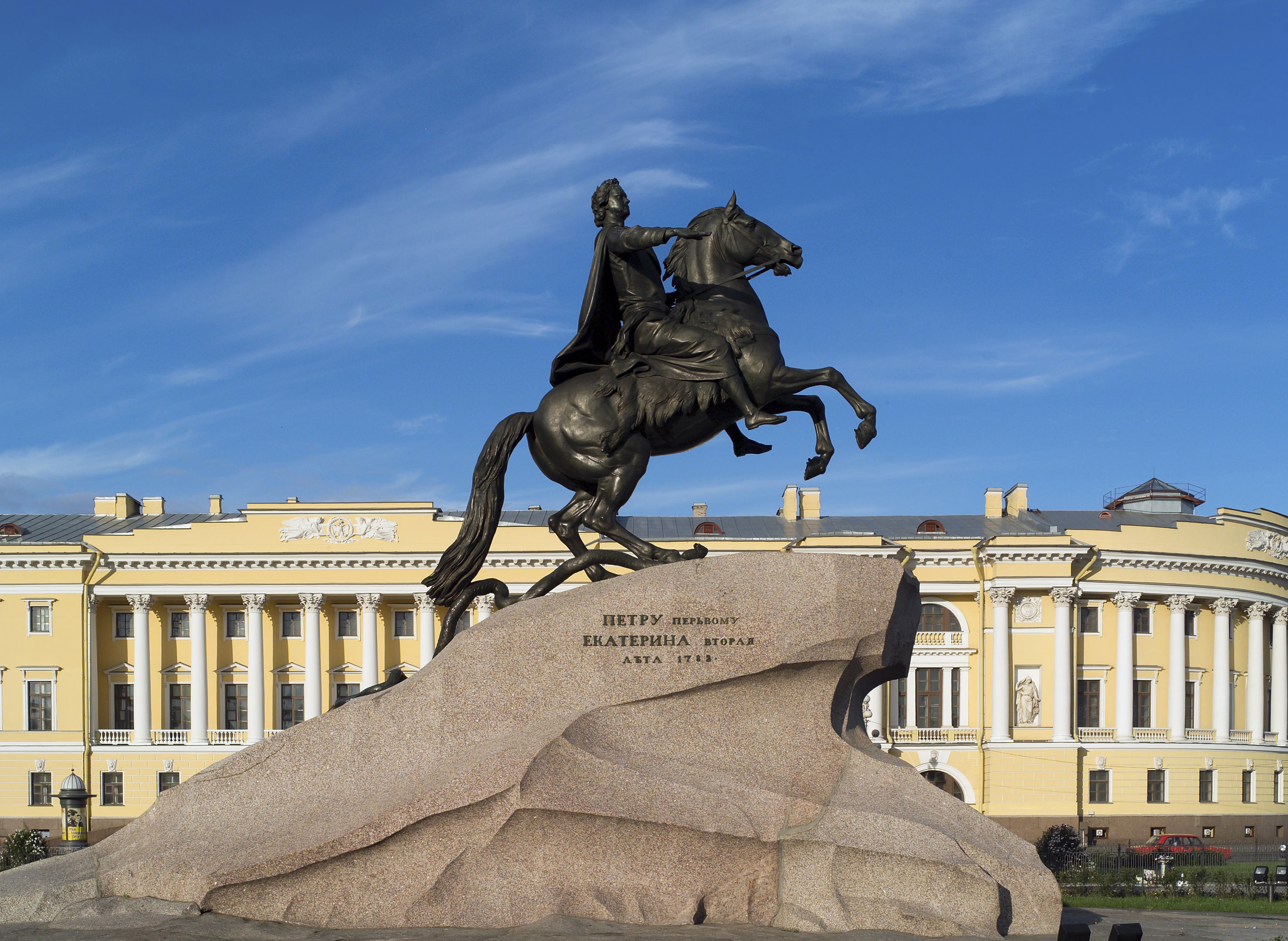
- Artist: Étienne Maurice Falconet
- Year: 1768–1782
- Type: Equestrian statue
- Location: St. Petersburg

The Bronze Horseman (Russian: Медный всадник, romanized: Medny vsadnik, lit. 'copper horseman') is an equestrian statue of Peter the Great in the Senate Square in Saint Petersburg, Russia. It was opened to the public on 18 August [O.S. 7 August] 1782. Commissioned by Catherine the Great, it was created by the French sculptor Étienne Maurice Falconet. The statue influenced an 1833 poem of the same name by Alexander Pushkin, which is widely considered one of the most significant works of Russian literature. The statue is now one of the symbols of Saint Petersburg.

The statue's pedestal is the Thunder Stone, the largest stone ever moved by humans. The stone originally weighed about 1500 tonnes, but was carved down during transportation to its current size and weight of 1,250 tons.

== Statue ==
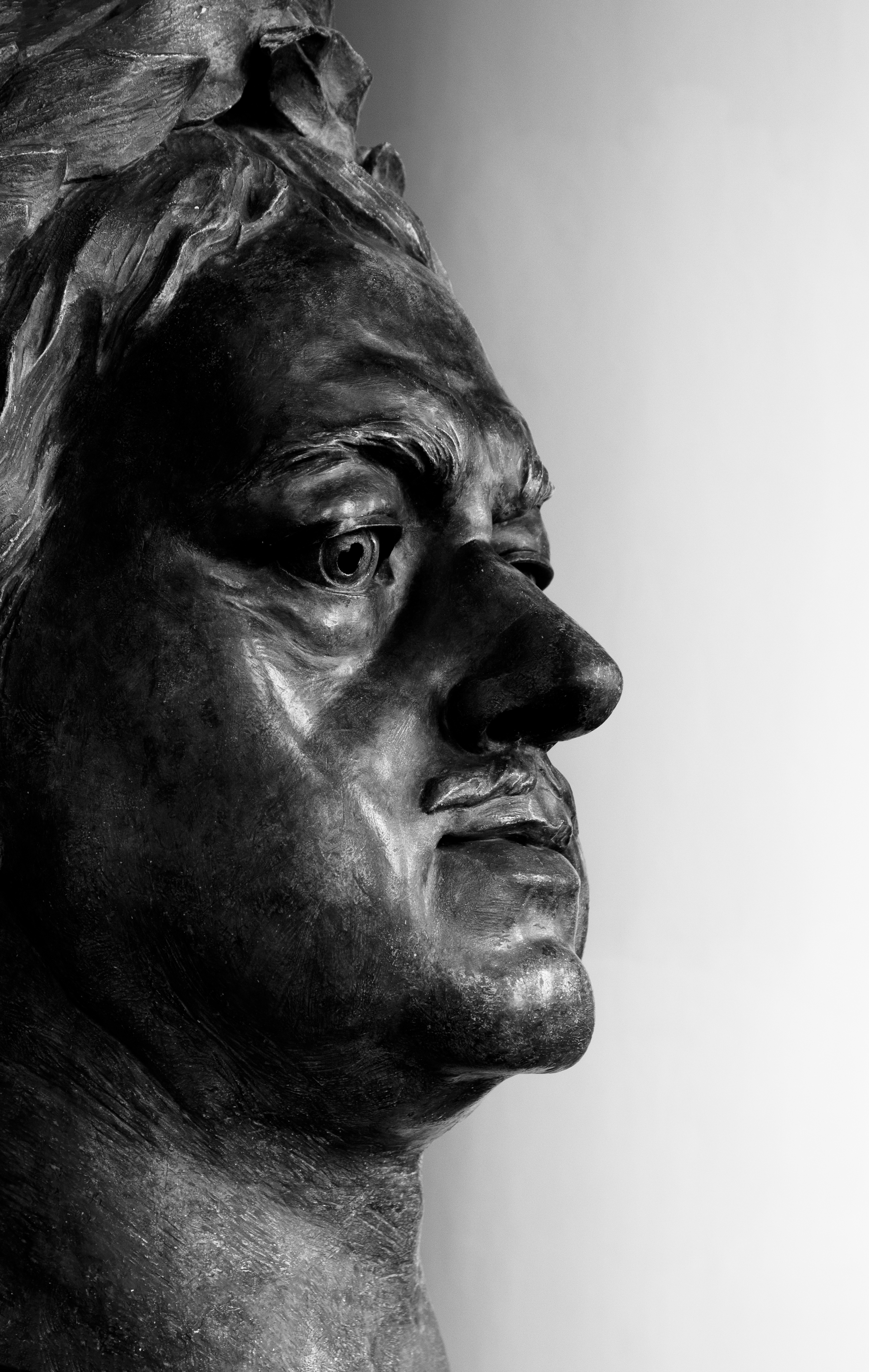
Head (original) of the model after which the monument by Falconet was cast in gypsum by Marie-Anne Collot. Russian Museum, Saint-Petersburg

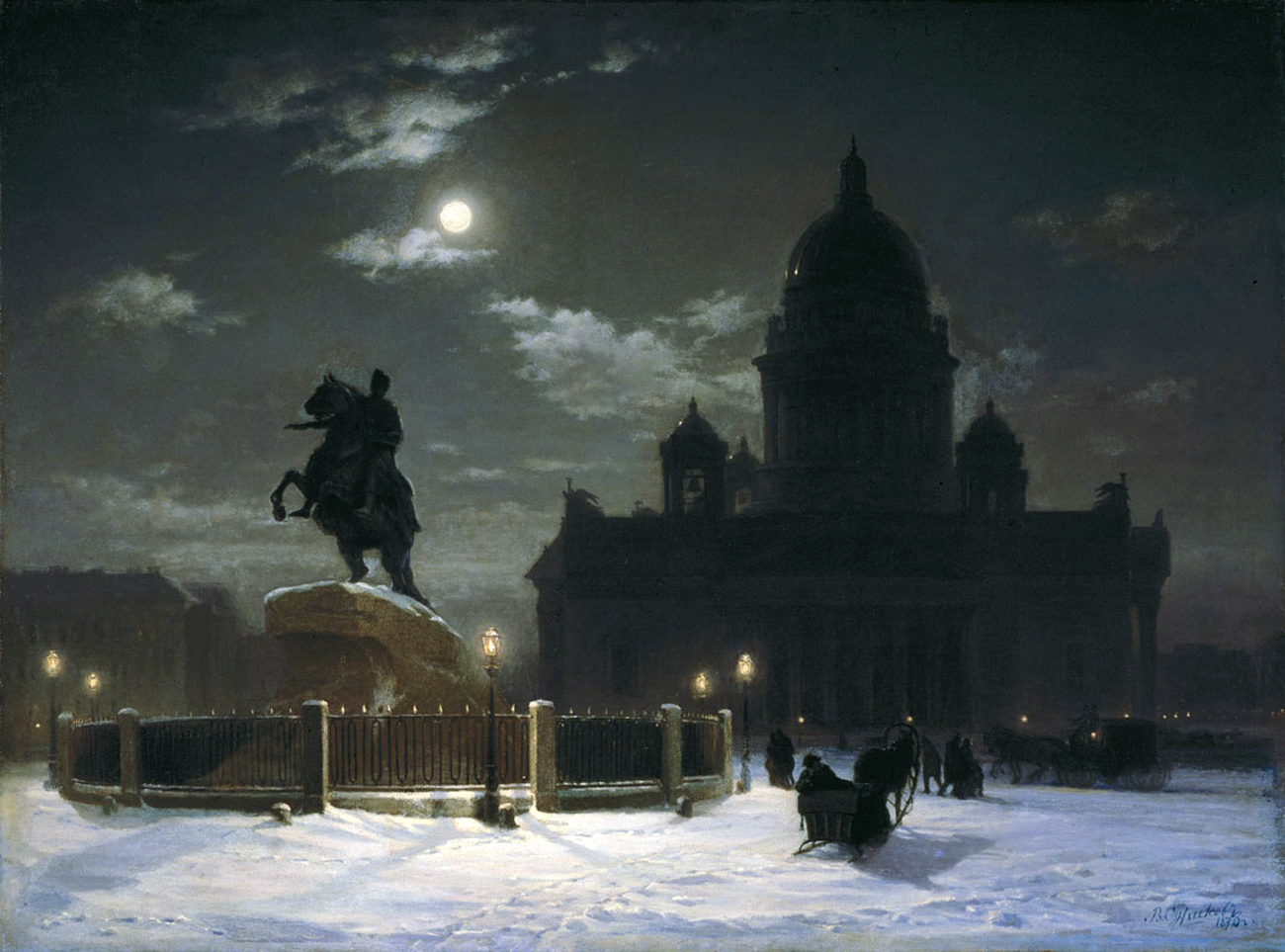
The Bronze Horseman, by Vasily Surikov

The equestrian statue of Peter the Great is situated in the Senate Square (formerly the Decembrists Square), in Saint Petersburg. Catherine the Great, a German princess who married into the Romanov line, was anxious to connect herself to Peter the Great to gain legitimacy in the eyes of the people. She ordered its construction, and had it inscribed with the phrases Petro Primo Catharina Secunda MDCCLXXXII in Latin and Петру первому Екатерина вторая, лѣта 1782 (Petru pervomu Ekaterina vtoraya, lěta 1782) in Russian, each meaning 'Catherine the Second to Peter the First, 1782', an expression of her admiration for her predecessor and her view of her own place in the line of great Russian rulers. Having gained her position through a palace coup, Catherine had no legal claim to the throne and wanted to represent herself as Peter's rightful heir.

In correspondence with Catherine the Great, Denis Diderot suggested French sculptor Étienne Maurice Falconet, a friend of his, for the commission. The empress followed his advice and Falconet arrived in Russia in 1766.

In 1775 the casting of the statue began, supervised by caster Emelyan Khailov. At one point during the casting, the mould broke, releasing molten bronze that started several fires. All the workers ran except Khailov, who risked his life to salvage the casting. After being remelted and recast, the statue was later finished. It took 12 years, from 1770 to 1782, to create the Bronze Horseman, including pedestal, horse and rider.

The tsar's face is the work of the young Marie-Anne Collot, then only 18 years old. She had accompanied Falconet as an apprentice on his trip to Russia in 1766. A student of Falconet and Jean-Baptiste Lemoyne, Collot was called Mademoiselle Victoire (Miss Victory) by Diderot. She modelled Peter the Great's face on his death mask and numerous portraits she found in Saint Petersburg. The right hand of the statue was modelled from a Roman bronze hand, found in 1771 in Voorburg in the Netherlands at the site of the ancient Roman town Forum Hadriani.

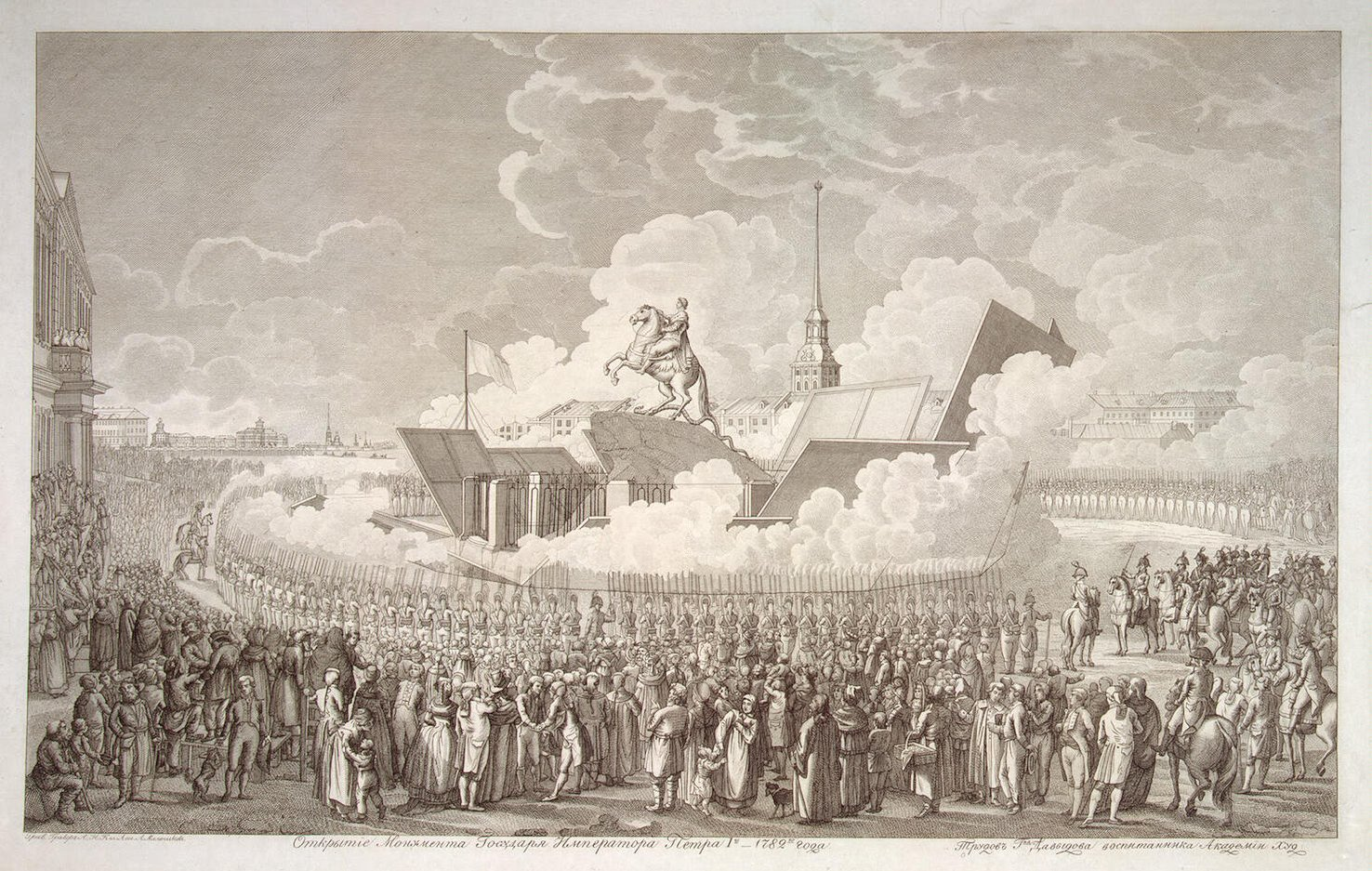
Inauguration of the Monument to Peter the Great. Engraving by A. K. Melnikov of the drawing by A. P. Davydov, 1782

On 7 August 1782, fourteen years after excavation of the pedestal began, the finished statue was unveiled in a ceremony with thousands in attendance. Conspicuously absent was Falconet, as a misunderstanding between him and the empress turned into a serious conflict. As a result, he was forced to leave Russia four years before the project was completed. Catherine largely forgot about him afterwards, and came to see the Bronze Horseman as her own oeuvre.

The statue portrays Peter the Great sitting heroically on his horse, his outstretched arm pointing towards the River Neva. The sculptor wished to capture the exact moment of his horse rearing at the edge of a dramatic cliff. His horse can be seen trampling a serpent, variously interpreted to represent treachery, evil, or the enemies of Peter and his reforms. The statue itself is about six metres (20 ft) tall, while the pedestal is another seven metres (23 ft) tall, for a total of approximately 13 metres (43 ft).

== Thunder Stone ==
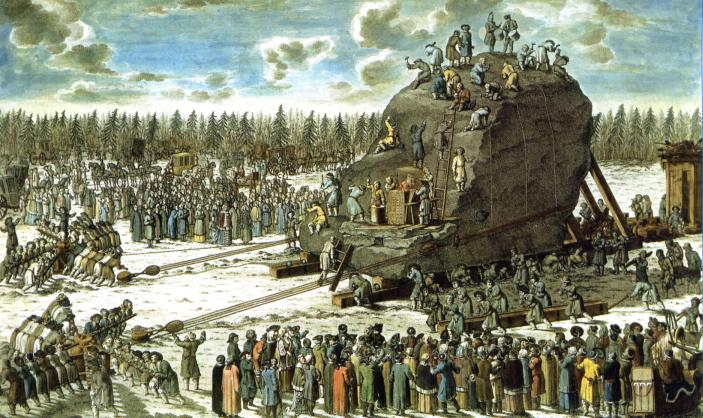
The Transportation of the Thunder-stone in the Presence of Catherine II; Engraving by I. F. Schley of the drawing by Yury Felten, 1770

For the pedestal, a rapakivi granite monolith boulder known as the Thunder Stone (Russian: Гром-камень, romanized: Grom-kamen) was found at Lakhta, 6 km (3.7 mi) inland from the Gulf of Finland in 1768. The Thunder Stone gained its name from a local legend that thunder split a piece off the stone. Falconet wanted to work on shaping the stone in its original location, but Catherine ordered it be moved before being cut. As it was embedded to half its depth in the ground and the area was marshy terrain, the Russians had to develop new methods to dig up and transport the colossal stone. Marinos Carburis (Μαρίνος Χαρμπούρης), a Greek from the Island of Kefallonia and serving as lieutenant-colonel in the Imperial Russian Army, offered to undertake the project. Carburis had studied engineering in Vienna and is considered the first Greek to hold a diploma in engineering.

Carburis directed workmen to wait for winter, when the ground was frozen, and then had them drag the large stone over the frozen ground to the sea for shipment and transport to the city. He developed a metallic sled that slid over bronze spheres about 13.5 cm (6 inches) in diameter, over a track. The process worked in a way similar to ball bearings. Making the feat even more impressive was that the labour was done entirely by humans; no animals or machines were used in bringing the stone from the original site to the Senate Square. After Carburis devised the method, it took 400 men nine months to move the stone, during which time master stonecutters continuously shaped the enormous granite monolith. Catherine periodically visited the effort to oversee their progress. The larger capstan was turned by 32 men, this just barely moving the rock. A further complication was the availability of only 100 m of track, which had to be constantly disassembled and relaid. Nevertheless, the workers made over 150 m of progress a day while on level ground. Upon arrival at the sea an enormous barge was constructed exclusively for the Thunder Stone. The vessel had to be supported on either side by two full-size warships. After a short voyage, the stone reached its destination in 1770, after nearly two years of work. A medal was issued to commemorate its arrival, with the legend "Close to Daring".

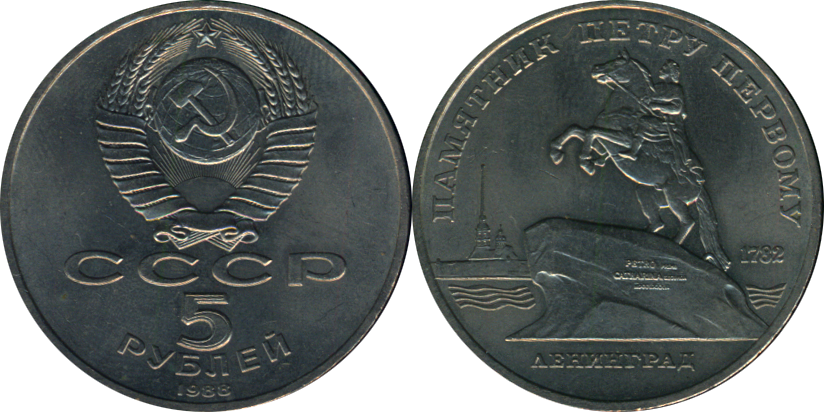
Commemorative coin released in the USSR in 1988 to commemorate the monument to Peter the Great

According to the fall 1882 edition of La Nature, the stone's dimensions before being cut were 7 by 14 by 9 metres (23 ft × 46 ft × 30 ft). Based on the density of granite, its weight was determined to be around 1,500 metric tons (1,700 short tons). Falconet had some of this cut away shaping it into a base, so the finished pedestal weighs considerably less.

== Siege of Leningrad ==
A 19th-century legend states that while the Bronze Horseman stands in the middle of Saint Petersburg, enemy forces will not be able to conquer the city. During the 900-day Siege of Leningrad by the invading Germans during the Second World War (Leningrad being the city's name from 1924 to 1991), the statue was covered with sandbags and a wooden shelter. Thus protected, it survived 900 days of bombing and artillery fire, virtually untouched.

== Poem ==
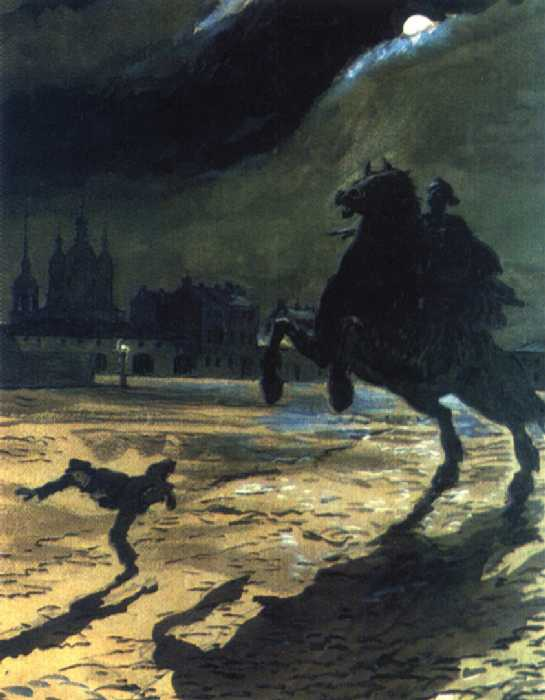
Alexandre Benois's illustration to the poem (1904)

The Bronze Horseman is the title of a poem written by Aleksandr Pushkin in 1833, widely considered to be one of the most significant works of Russian literature. Due to the popularity of his work, the statue came to be called the "Bronze Horseman". A major theme of the poem is conflict between the needs of the state and the needs of ordinary citizens.

In the poem, Pushkin describes the fates of the poor man Evgenii and his beloved Parasha during a severe flood of the Neva. Evgenii curses the statue, furious at Peter the Great for founding a city in such an unsuitable location and indirectly causing the death of his beloved. Coming to life, the horseman chases Evgenii through the city. The poem closes with the discovery of the young man's corpse in a ruined hut floating at the edge of the river.

In 1903 the artist Alexandre Benois published an edition of the poem with his illustrations, creating what was considered a masterwork of Art Nouveau.

The poem has inspired works in other genres: Reinhold Glière choreographed a ballet based on it, and Nikolai Myaskovsky's 10th Symphony (1926–7) was inspired by the poem. The statue itself has been seen as the inspiration or model for a similar statue which appears in Joseph Conrad's 1904 political novel Nostromo, thus implicitly linking the political events in Nostromo with Conrad's 1905 essay "Autocracy and War" on the subject of Russia and his eventual 1912 novel Under Western Eyes (and also with the Pushkin poem and with the political issue of Poland).

== Gallery ==
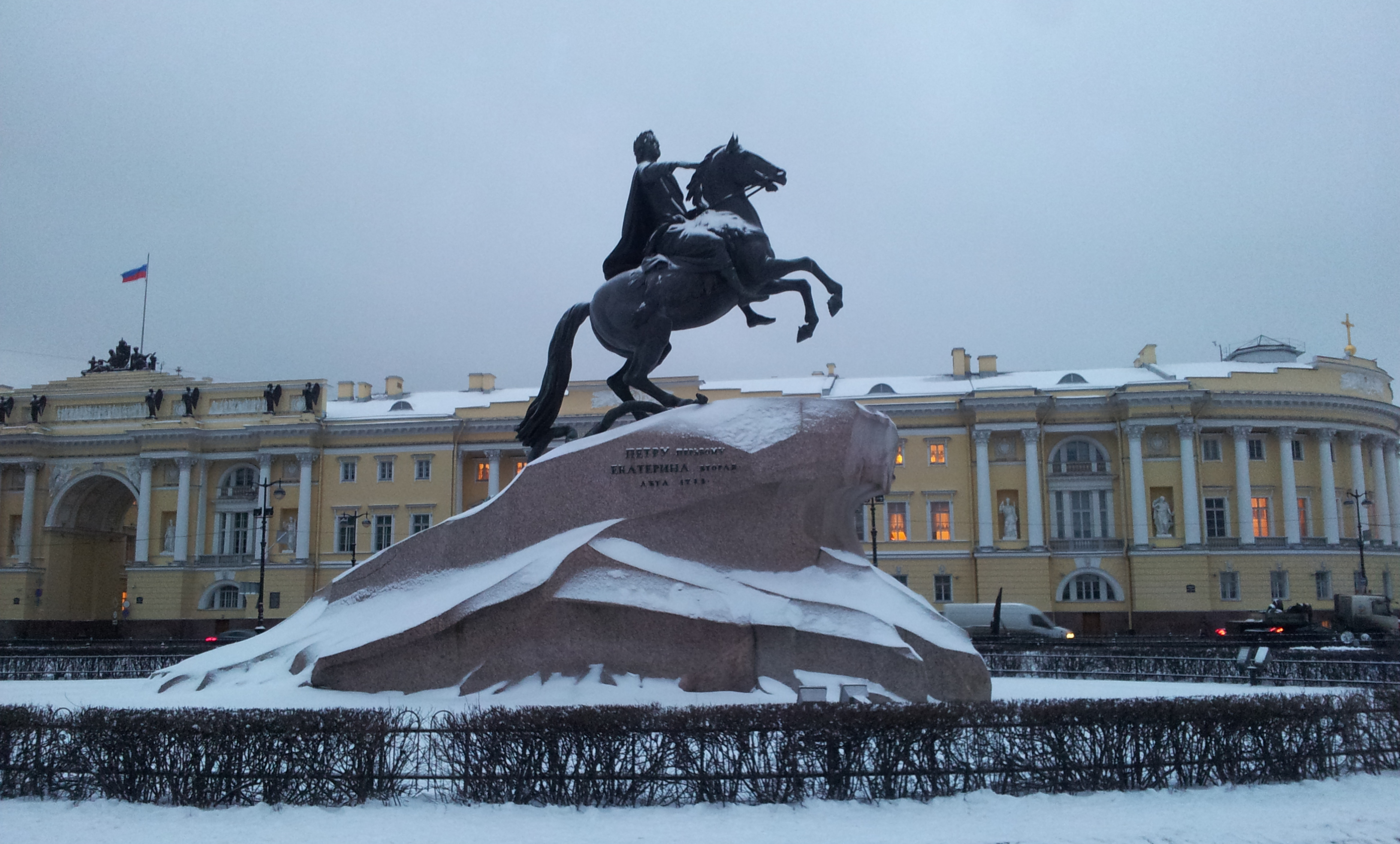
Statue of Peter the Great in the winter

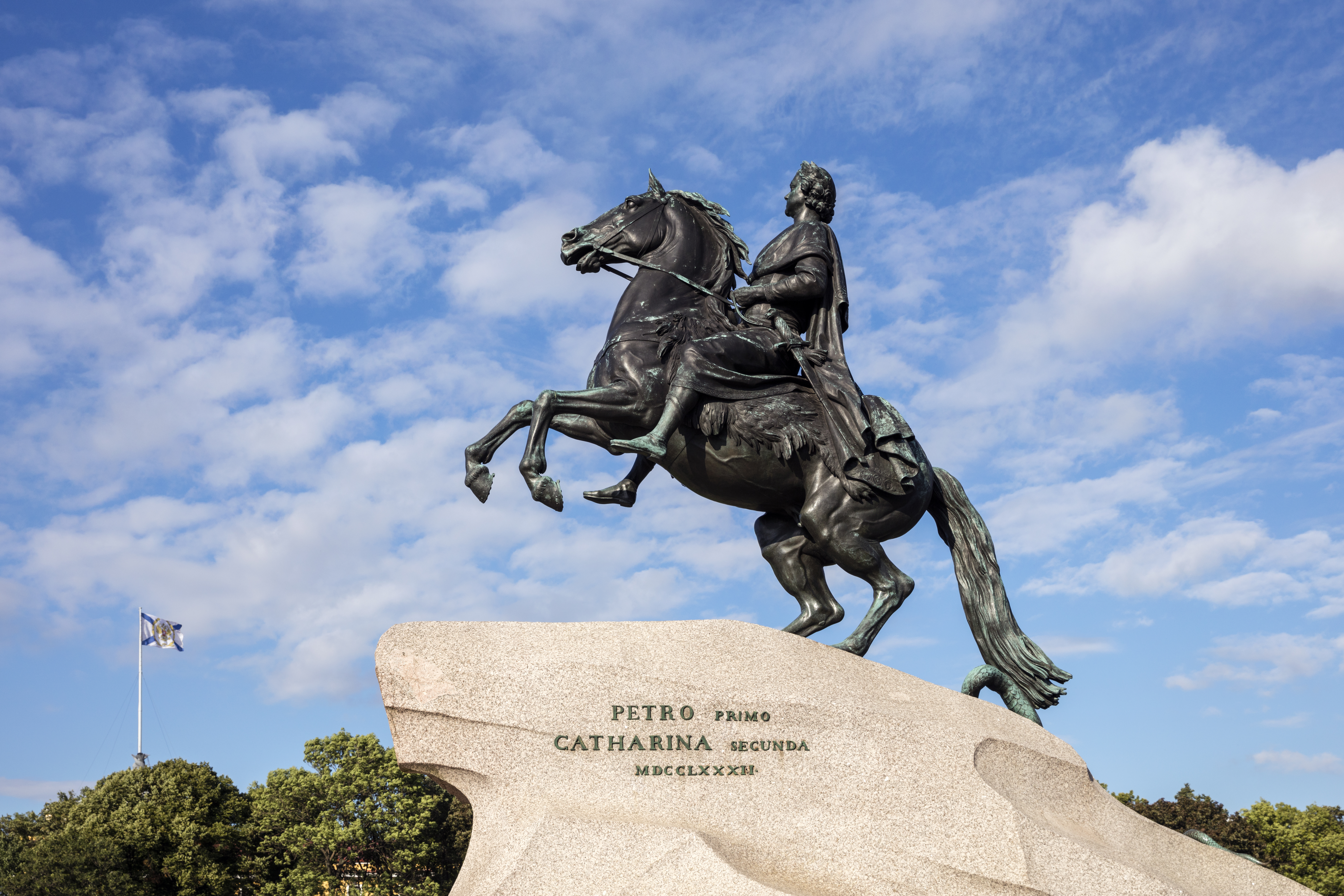
Side with the Latin inscription. The other side of the pedestal carries the same inscription in Russian.
