= Marie-Anne Collot =

French sculptor (1748–1821)

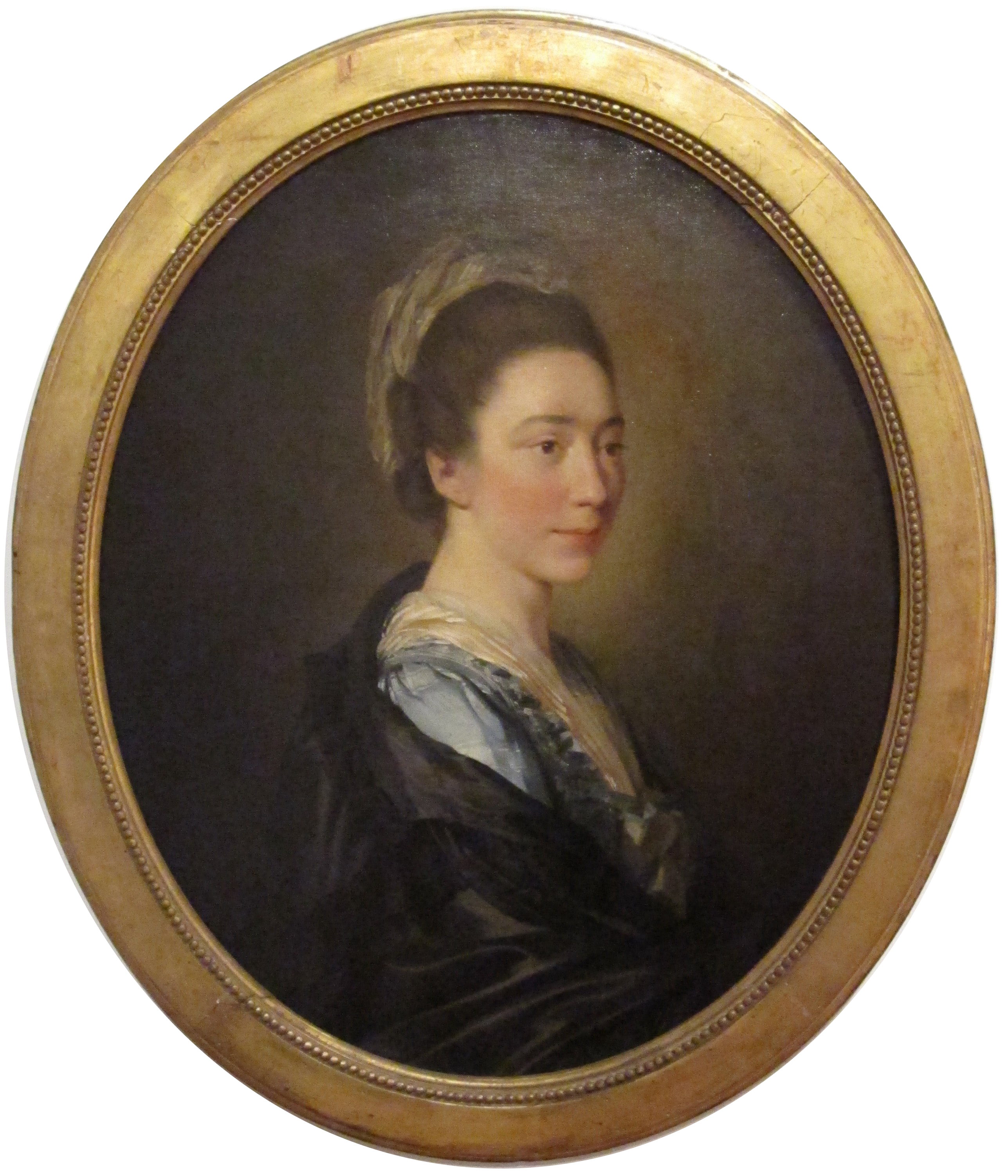
Portrait by Pierre-Étienne Falconet, 1773, oils; Museum of Fine Arts of Nancy

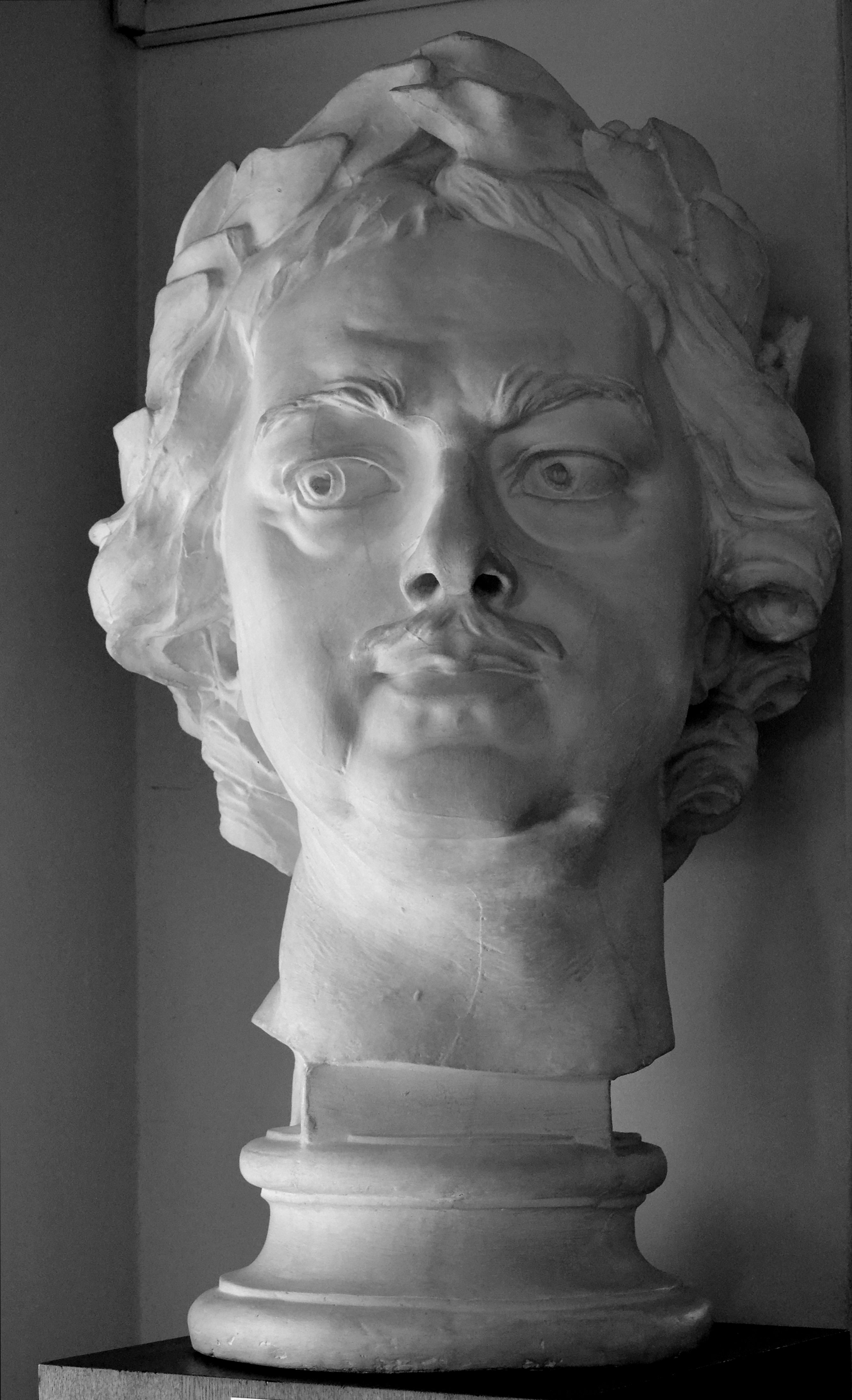
Head of Peter the Great, study for the Bronze Horseman, c. 1768—1770; Russian Museum, Saint Petersburg.

Marie-Anne Collot (English: /kɒˈloʊ/ ko-LOH, French: [maʁi an kɔlo]; 1748 – 24 February 1821) was a French sculptor. She was the student and daughter-in-law of Étienne Falconet and is most well known as a portraitist, close to the philosophic and artistic circles of Diderot and Catherine the Great.

== Falconet's student ==
Marie-Anne Collot was born in Paris and started to work as a model at the age of 15 in the workshop of Jean-Baptiste II Lemoyne. He had a determining influence on her career as a portraitist. She then entered Etienne Falconet's workshop, who was a close friend of Diderot. She became Falconet's pupil and faithful friend. Her younger brother became an apprentice at the publisher's André le Breton, who was one of the four publishers of Diderot and D'Alembert's Encyclopédie.

== Early sculptures ==
Her first works consisted of terracotta busts of Falconet's friends including Diderot, the actor Préville in the role of Sganarelle in “Le médecin malgré lui” by Molière, and Prince Dimitri Alexeievich Galitzine, Russian ambassador. Many other works are now lost.

== The Russian years 1766-1778 and Peter the Great's head ==
In October 1766 Marie-Anne Collot accompanied her mentor, Etienne-Maurice Falconet, to St. Petersburg, when he was invited by Catherine the Great with a view to creating an equestrian statue of Peter the Great called “The Bronze Horseman”.

During this period, she sculpted portraits of members of the Russian Court. At 18 years old, she gained attention as one of the few young female sculptors active at the time.

Marie-Anne also created the plaster model that was selected for the Peter the Great's head for the statue, after Catherine had rejected three attempts by Falconet.

In December of the same year she presented her work to the Imperial Academy of Arts, of which she was elected an Academician, — the first and, until Julie Hagen-Schwarz, the only woman to do so, — on 20 January 1767.

She received a comfortable pension, which to her represented a fortune.

== Marble busts ==
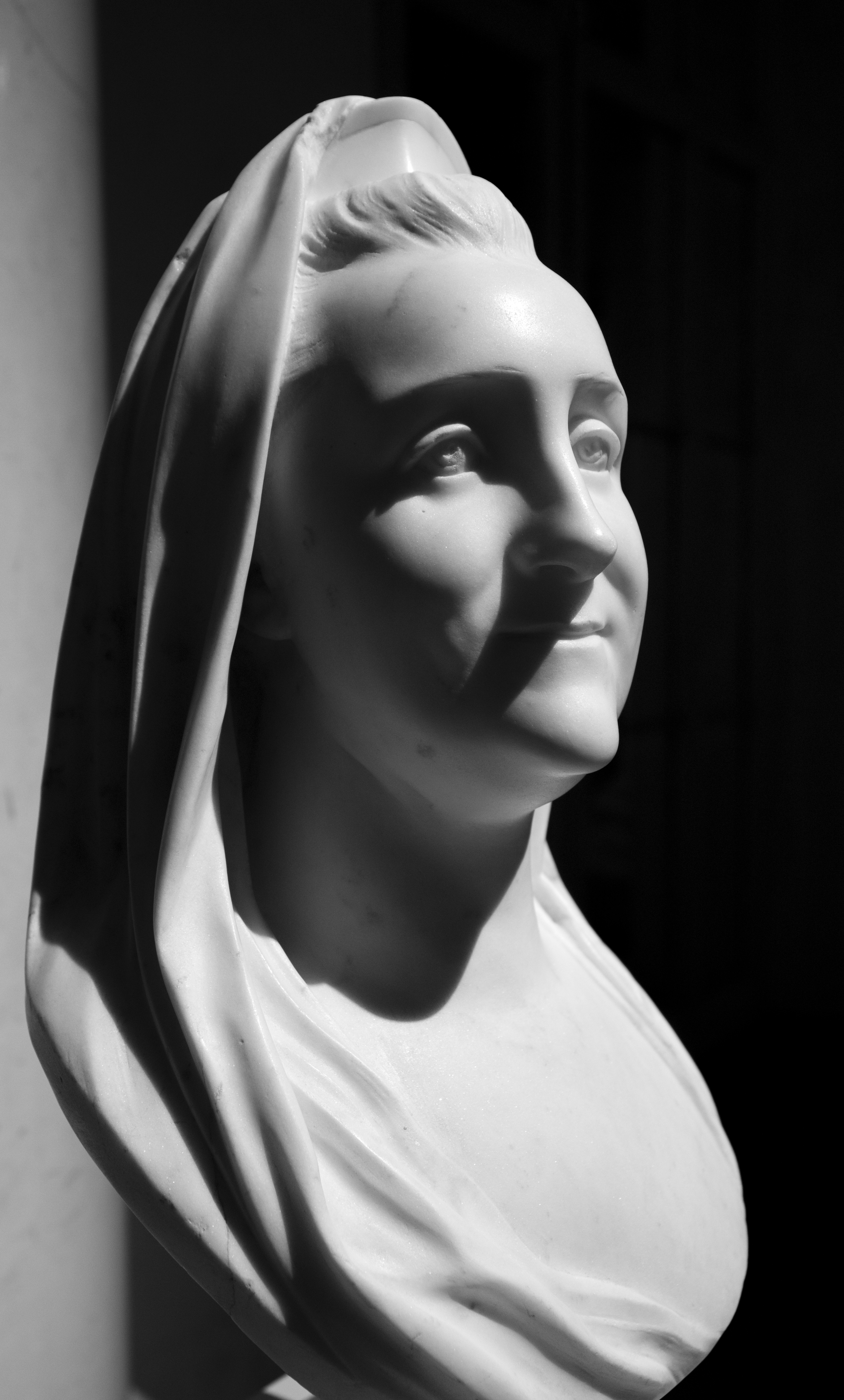
Portrait of Catherine the Great, marble, 1769; Hermitage Museum, St. Petersburg

Collot sculpted a bust representing Falconet at Catherine the Great's request. This is now in the Museum of Fine Art in Nancy, France. She also requested a bust of Diderot in 1772. When Falconet saw its quality it is said that he destroyed the one he had made himself of Diderot. The bust is in the State Hermitage Museum in St. Petersburg.

Then followed busts of Henry IV of France, Sully, Voltaire, and possibly one of D'Alembert (now lost?). Also several of the Empress herself, the Grand Duke Paul I and his wife the Grand Duchess Natalia, as well as marble medallions of historical characters and people associated with the Russian court; Peter the Great, the Empress Elizabeth, and Lady Cathcart, the wife of Lord Cathcart, British Ambassador to Russia. She also made a superb bust of their daughter Mary. It was said that there started to be a shortage of marble in St. Petersburg.

== Marriage and the return to France ==
In 1777 Marie-Anne Collot married the painter Pierre-Etienne Falconet in St. Petersburg. He was the son of Etienne Falconet. She moved to England with him where he studied with Joshua Reynolds. In England, she continued her passion with sculpting more busts, including one of Lady Cathcart. They had the sole daughter together, Marie-Lucie, born in April 1778. The marriage was, however, unhappy and short-lived. Madame Falconet returned to France in 1778 with her baby.

== The stay in Holland ==
In 1782 Collot went to Holland at the invitation of her friend, Princess Galitzine. While there, she sculpted the marble busts of William, Prince of Orange, and of his wife, Princess Wilhelmina of Prussia.

== An early retirement ==
Collot gave up sculpting completely, concentrating from then on her daughter's education and helping her father-in-law who had fallen gravely ill. She continued to do so until his death in 1791.

The French Revolution completely upset the world of artists, writers and philosophers. With her master, her husband and her friends having died, in 1791 Madame Falconet bought a country estate at Marimont, near the village of Bourdonnay in Moselle, France. She retired to there and led a peaceful life. She died in Nancy, and is buried at Bourdonnay.

== Works of art ==
- In the State Hermitage Museum, St. Petersburg
  - Bust of Falconet
  - Bust of Diderot
  - Bust of Voltaire
  - Bust of Henry IV
  - Bust of Sully
- (location to be specified)
  - Bust of Catherine the Great (probably in the Hermitage Museum)
  - Bust of Peter the Great and several busts of Catherine the Great
- In the Russian Museum, St. Petersburg
  - Portrait of Peter the Great
  - Medallion of the Count Grigory Grigoryevich Orlov
- In the Marble Palace, St. Petersburg
  - Bust of the Grand Duke Paul
  - Bust of the Grand Duchess Natalia
- In the State Museum at Tsarskoye Selo, south of St. Petersburg
  - Bust of a young Russian girl
- In the Louvre Museum, Paris
  - Portrait assumed to be of Peter the Great
  - Portrait assumed to be of Étienne Noël Damilaville
  - Portrait assumed to be of Mary Cathcart, the daughter of the British ambassador to Russia
- In the Musée des Beaux-Arts, Nancy, France
  - Portrait of Etienne-Maurice Falconet
  - Portrait of his son Pierre-Etienne Falconet
- In private collections
  - Portrait of Melchior Grimm
  - Portrait of Dimitri Alexeïevitch Galitzine
  - Marble medallion of Lady Cathcart
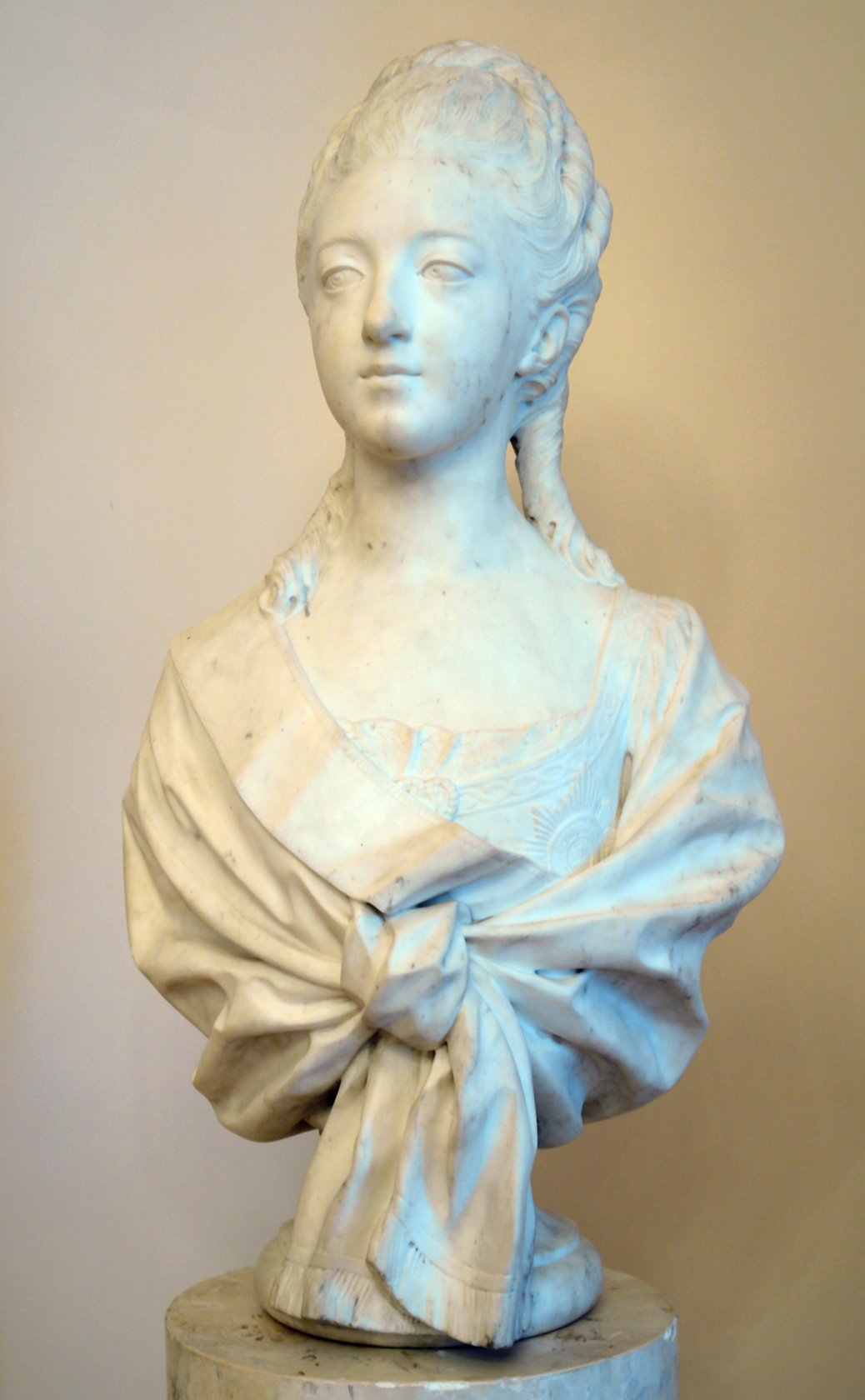
Grand Duchess Natalia Alexeievna

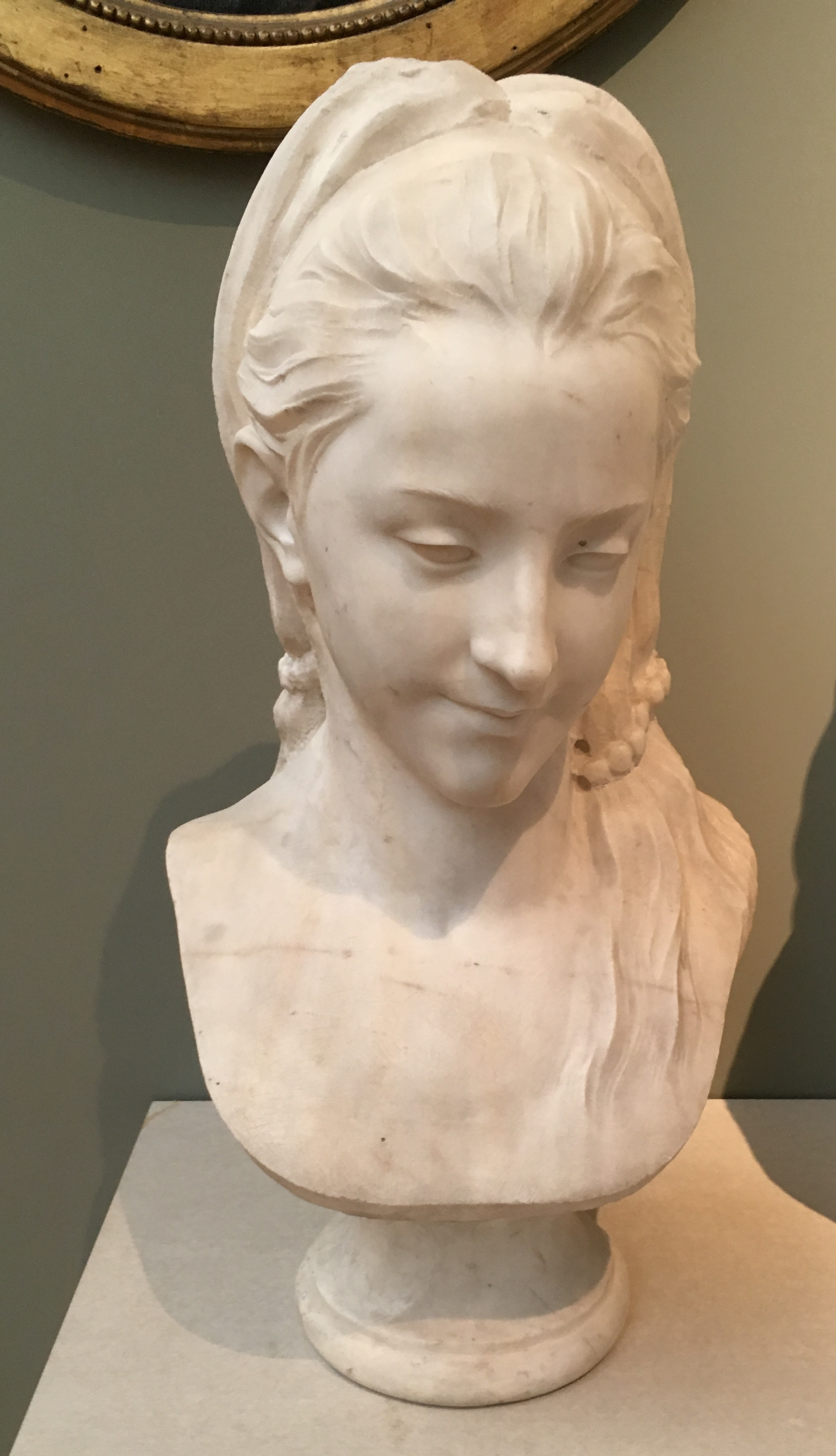
Mary Cathcart

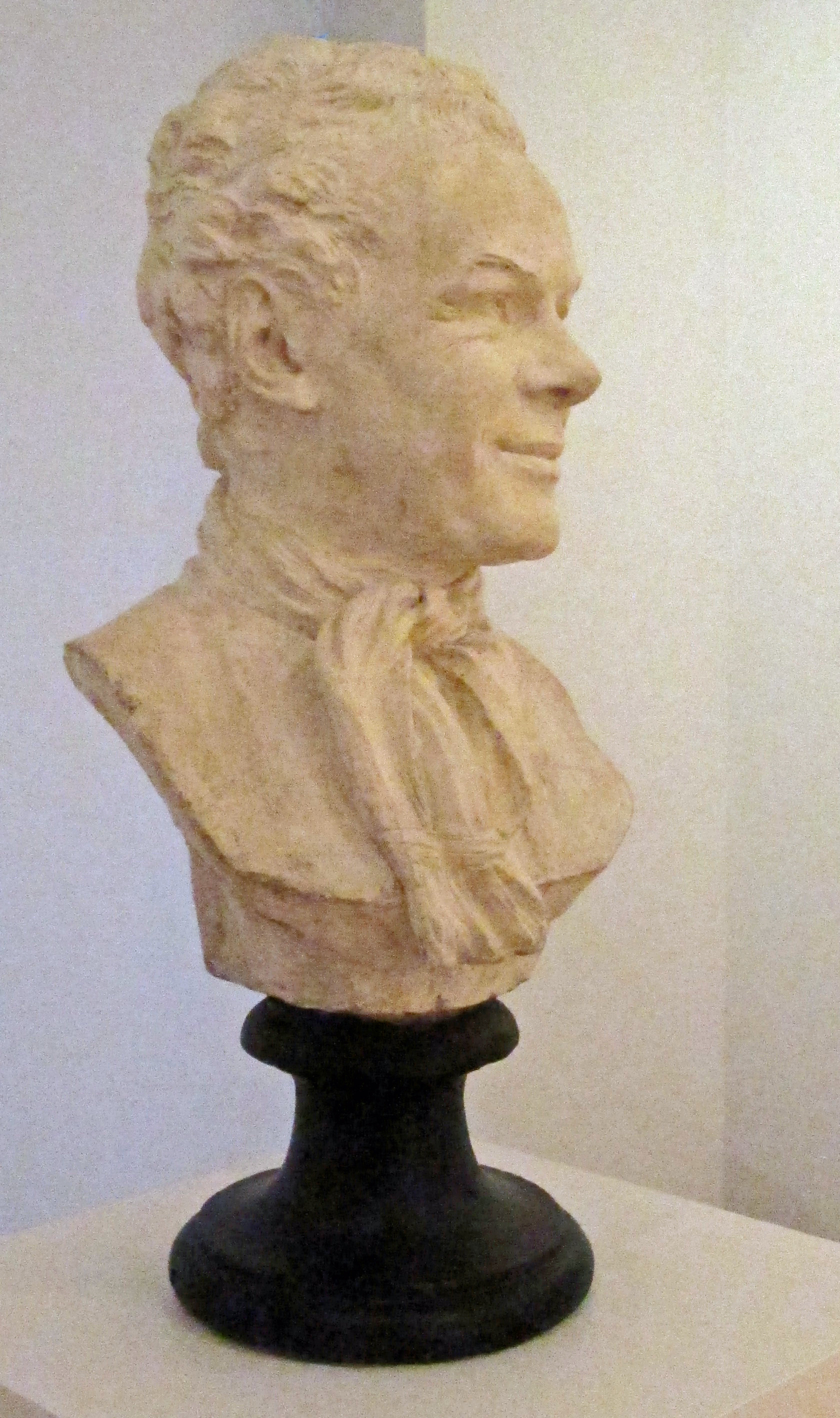
Étienne Maurice Falconet

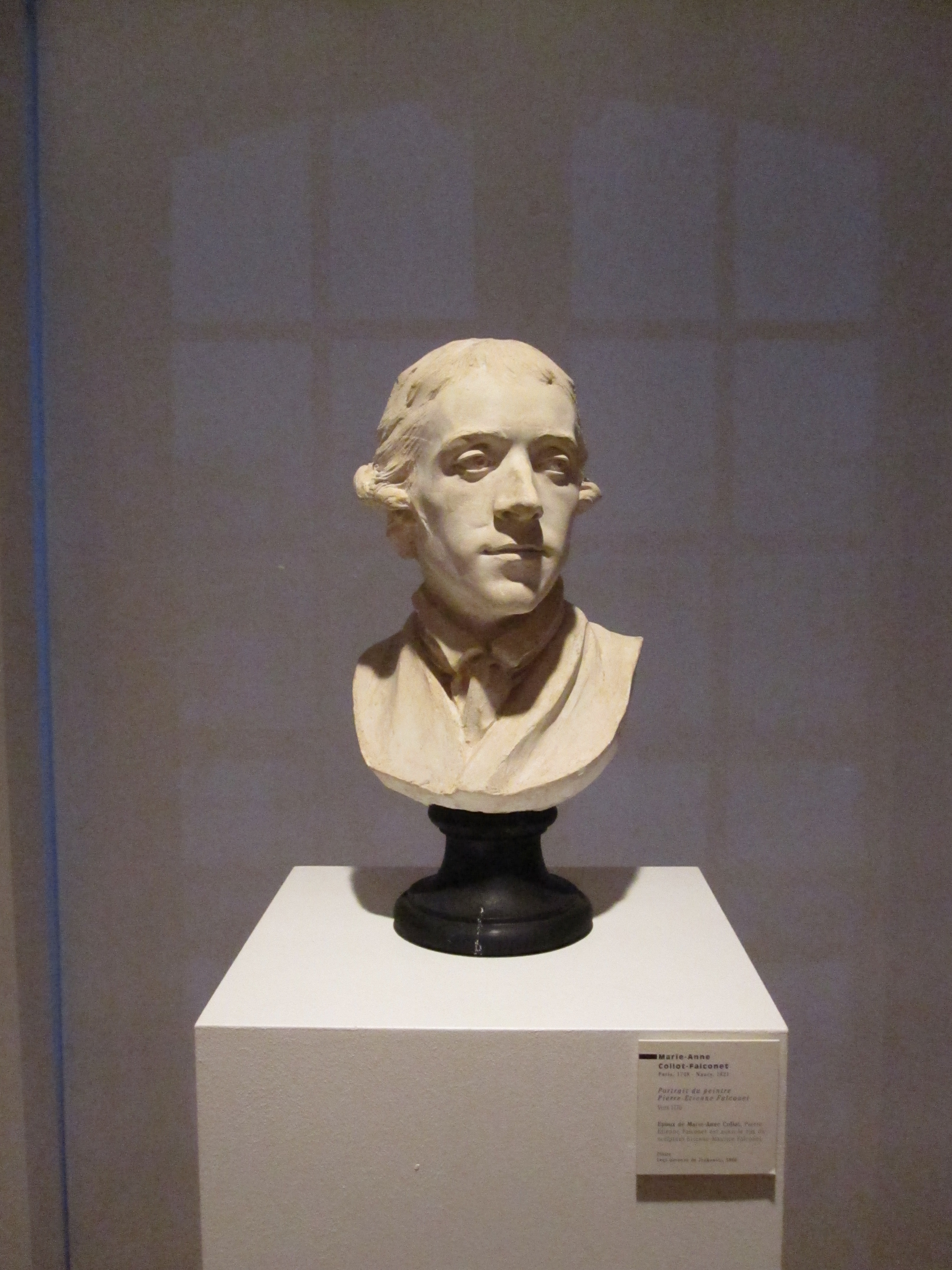
Pierre-Etienne Falconet

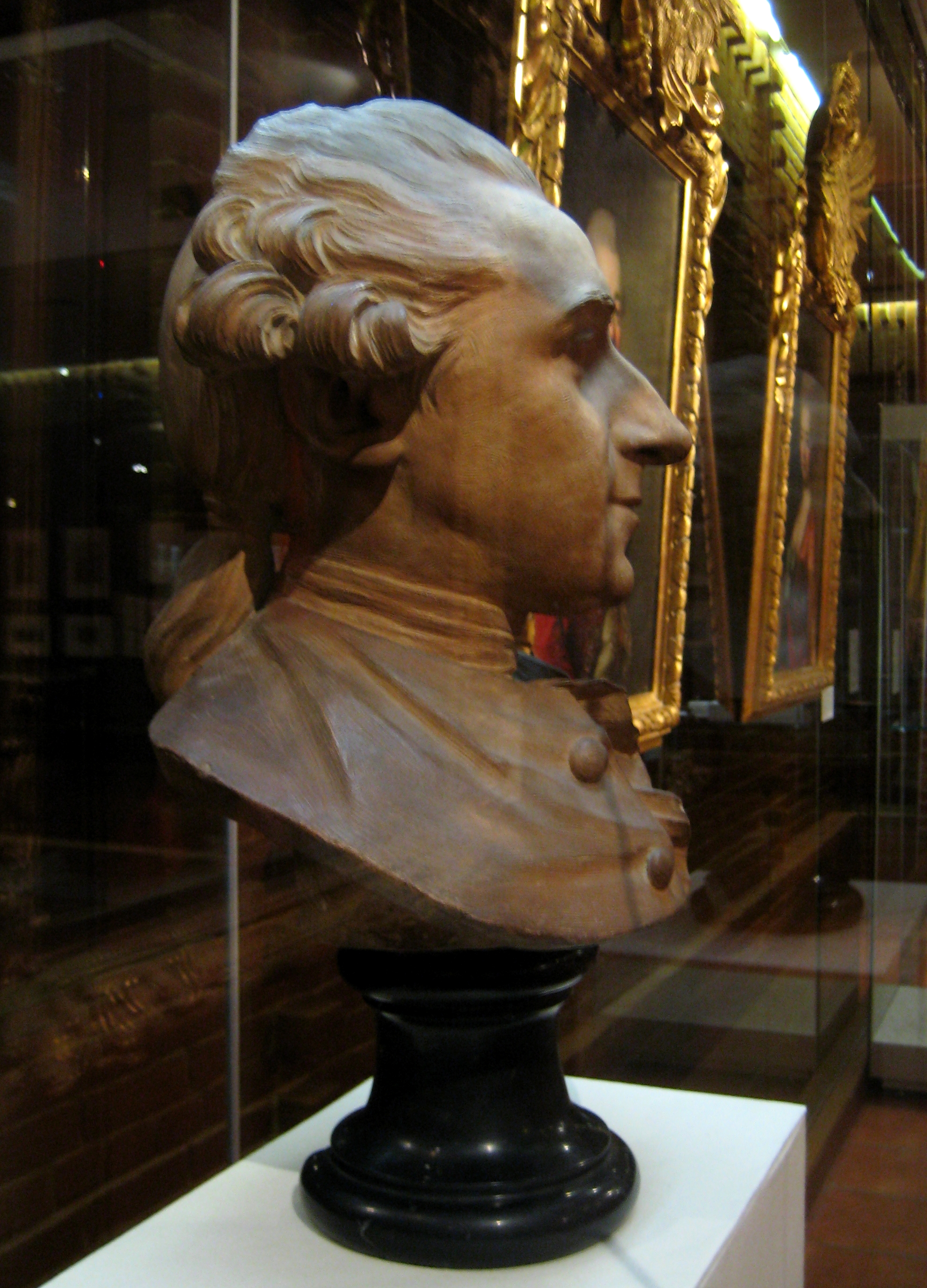
Demetrius Alekseyevich Gallitzin

== Sources, bibliography (in French) ==
- Christiane Dellac, Marie-Anne Collot: Une sculptrice française à la cour de Catherine II, 1748-1821, L'Harmattan, (2005) (ISBN 2747588335). This book includes a bibliography and a list of works of art, as well as a portrait of the artist on the cover,
- Charles Cournault, Marie-Anne Collot (1869)
- Charles Cournault, Catalogue du Musée de la ville de Nancy
- Louis Réau, Etienne-Maurice Falconet 1716-1791, Paris, Delmotte, 1922, t.II, chap. IV (L'Oeuvre de Marie-Anne Collot), p. 429-448
- M.L. Becker, Marie-Anne Collot, L'art de la terre-cuite au féminin, L'Objet d'Art, n° 325, juin 1998. A convincing clarification of the portraits called “of Grimm and Damilaville”, and a portrait of Collot painted by her husband Pierre-Etienne,
- M.L. Becker, Marie Collot à Pétersbourg, La culture française et les archives russes, Centre International d'études du XVIIIe siècle, Ferney-Voltaire, 2004. In the appendix a provisional catalogue of the works of art, mentioning those whose location is unknown, Numerous photos,
- M.L. Becker, Le buste de Diderot, de Collot à Houdon, L'Objet d'Art, n° 412, avril 2006
- Digitaal Vrouwenlexicon van Nederland [2007]
