= D.P. Pariset =

D.P. Pariset (c. 1740 - active in 1783), also known as Pariset fils, was a French engraver active in England and France.

Pariset was born in Lyon and studied under Gilles Demarteau from whom he learned the art of engraving in the chalk style. In 1769 he relocated to London, where he worked for William Ryland and later Peter Falconet on portraits of members of the Royal Academy of Arts, including Sir Joshua Reynolds, Benjamin West, Francis Cotes and William Ryland. He also engraved plates for a print collection from the drawings of great masters.

After his return to France, he announced in the Mercure de France of October 1783 (p. 142) that he had worked for ten years in England, where he "a coopéré à quantité d'estampes qui ont fait la réputation des graveurs titulaires" and acquired expertise in "la manière Anglaise".
