= Étienne Maurice Falconet =

French sculptor (1716–1791)

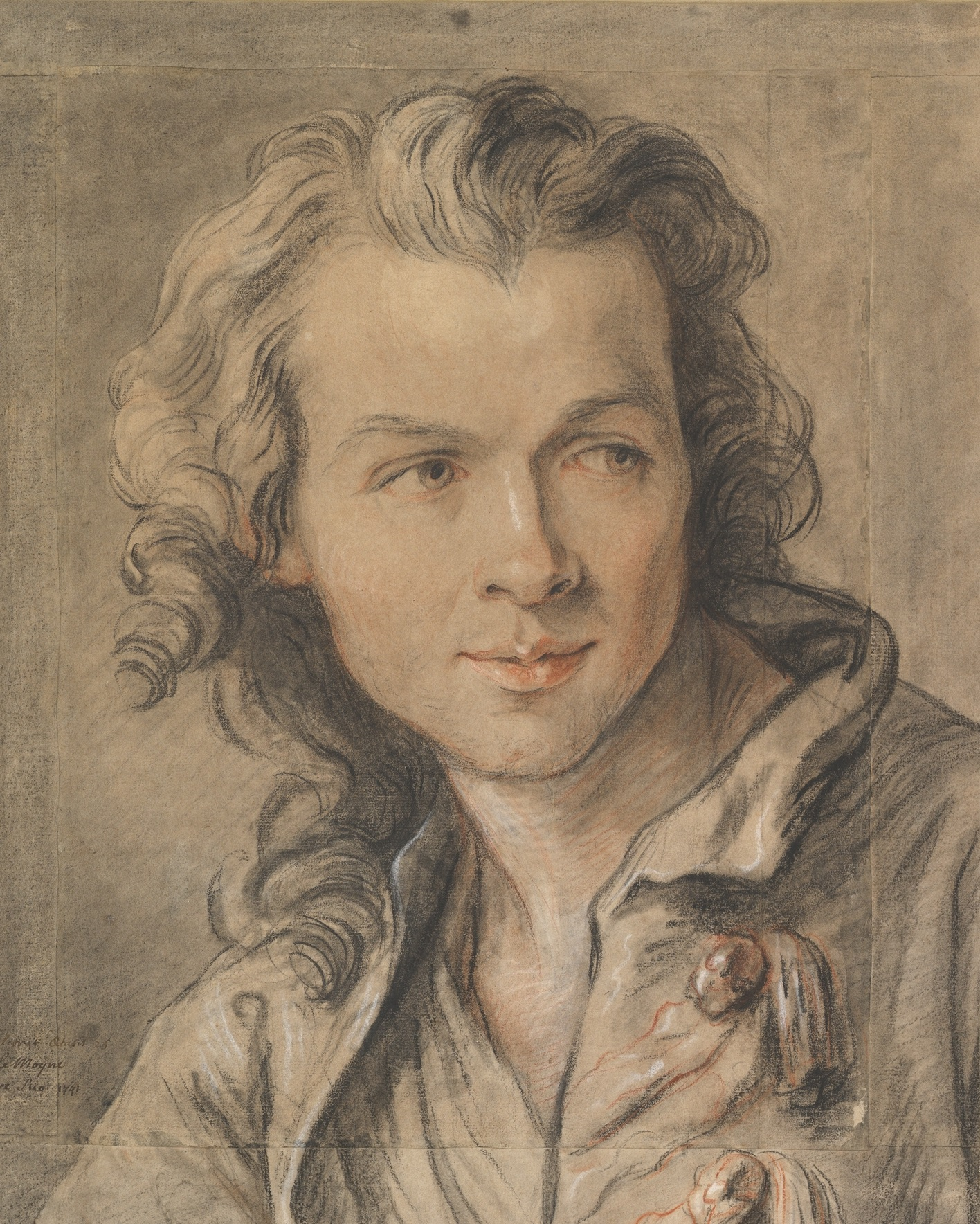
- Falconet by Jean-Baptiste Lemoyne, 1741
- Born: 1 December 1716; Paris, France
- Died: 24 January 1791 (aged 74); Paris, France
- Known for: Sculpture
- Notable work: Bronze Horseman
- Movement: Baroque, Rococo, Neoclassicism
- Children: 4, including Pierre-Etienne
- Relatives: Marie-Anne Collot (daughter-in-law)

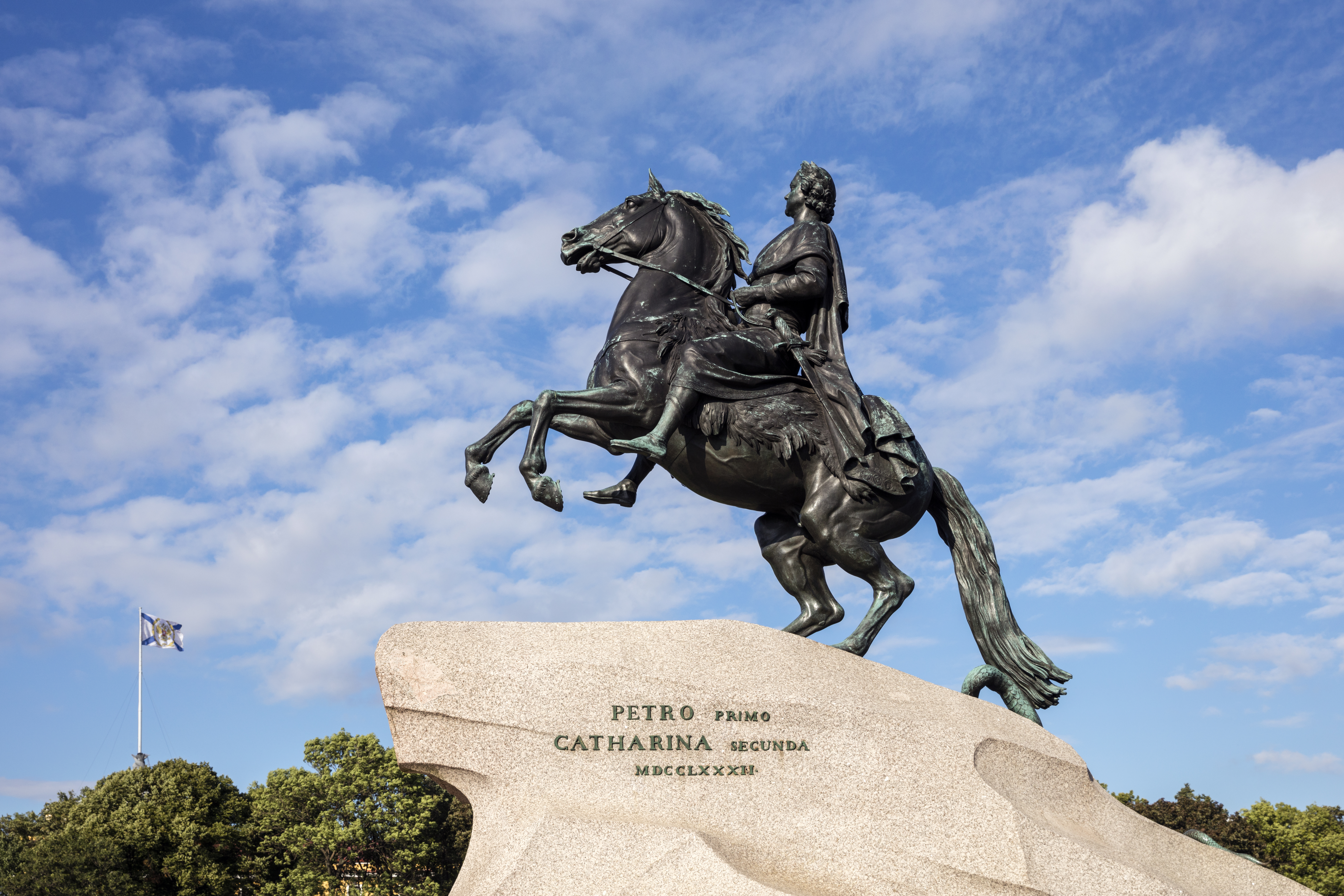
The Bronze Horseman, the most famous sculpture of Falconet, representing Tsar Peter I of Russia

Étienne Maurice Falconet (1 December 1716 – 24 January 1791) was a French baroque, rococo and neoclassical sculptor, best-known for his equestrian statue of Peter the Great, the Bronze Horseman (1782), in Saint Petersburg, Russia, and for the small statues he produced in series for the Royal Sévres Porcelain Manufactory.

== Life and work ==
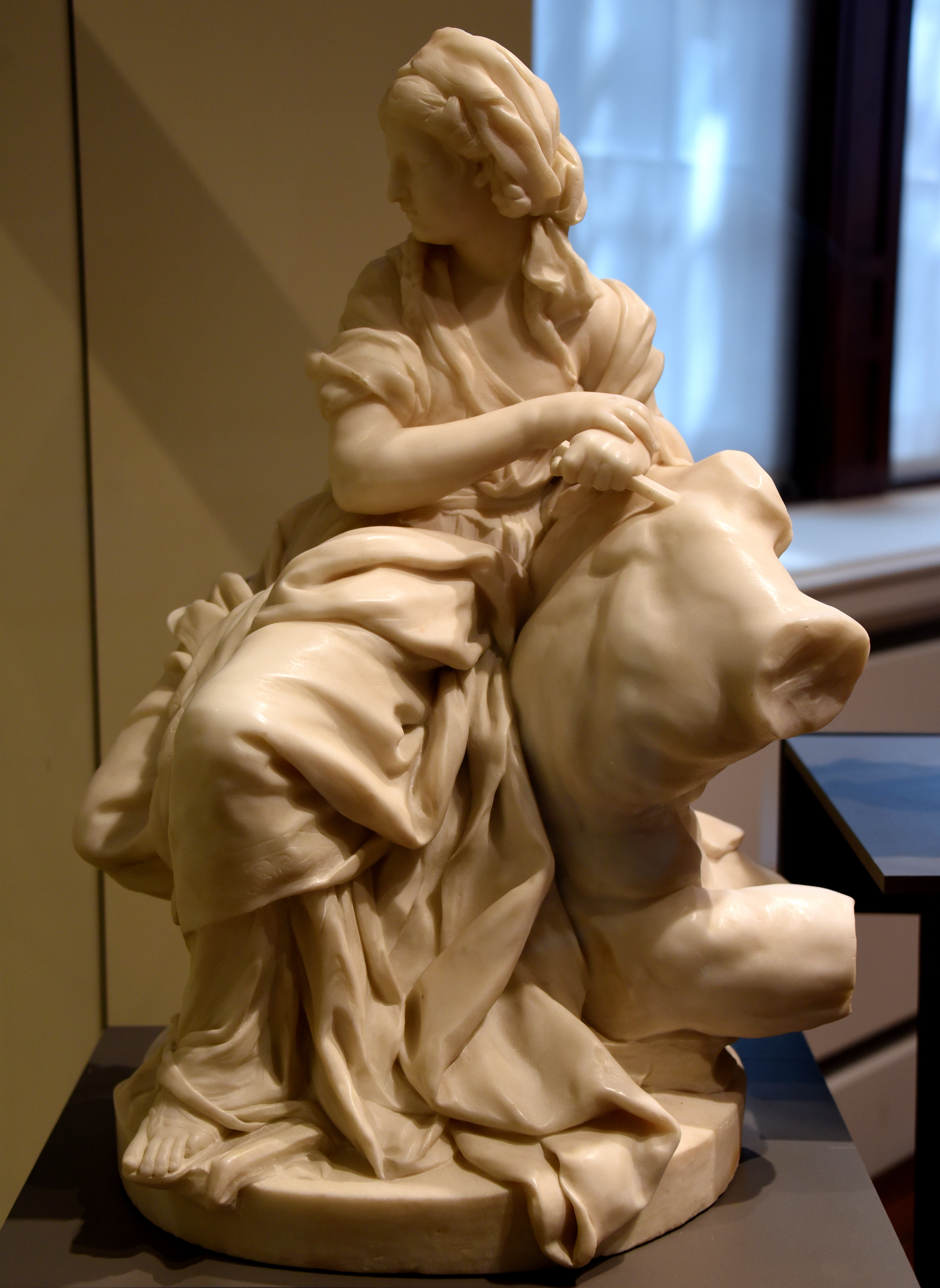
The Allegory of Sculpture, 1746; Victoria and Albert Museum, London

Falconet was born to a poor family in Paris. He was at first apprenticed to a marble-cutter, but some of his clay and wood figures, with the making of which he occupied his leisure hours, attracted the notice of the sculptor Jean-Baptiste Lemoyne, who made him his pupil. One of his most successful early sculptures was of Milo of Croton, which secured his admission to the membership of the Académie royale de peinture et de sculpture in 1754.

He came to prominent public attention in the Salons of 1755 and 1757 with his marbles of L'Amour (Cupid) and the Nymphe descendant au bain (also called The Bather), which is now at the Louvre. In 1757 Falconet was appointed by the Marquise de Pompadour as director of the sculpture atelier of the new Manufacture royale de porcelaine at Sèvres, where he brought new life to the manufacture of unglazed soft-paste porcelain figurines, small-scale sculptures that had been a specialty at the predecessor of the Sèvres manufactory, Vincennes.

The influence of the painter François Boucher and of contemporary theater and ballet are equally in evidence in Falconet's subjects, and in his sweet, elegantly erotic, somewhat coy manner. Right at the start, in the 1750s, Falconet created for Sèvres a set of white biscuit porcelain garnitures of tabletop putti (Falconet's "Enfants") illustrating "the Arts," and meant to complement the manufacture's grand dinner service ("Service du Roy"). The fashion for similar small table sculptures spread to most of the porcelain manufacturies of Europe.

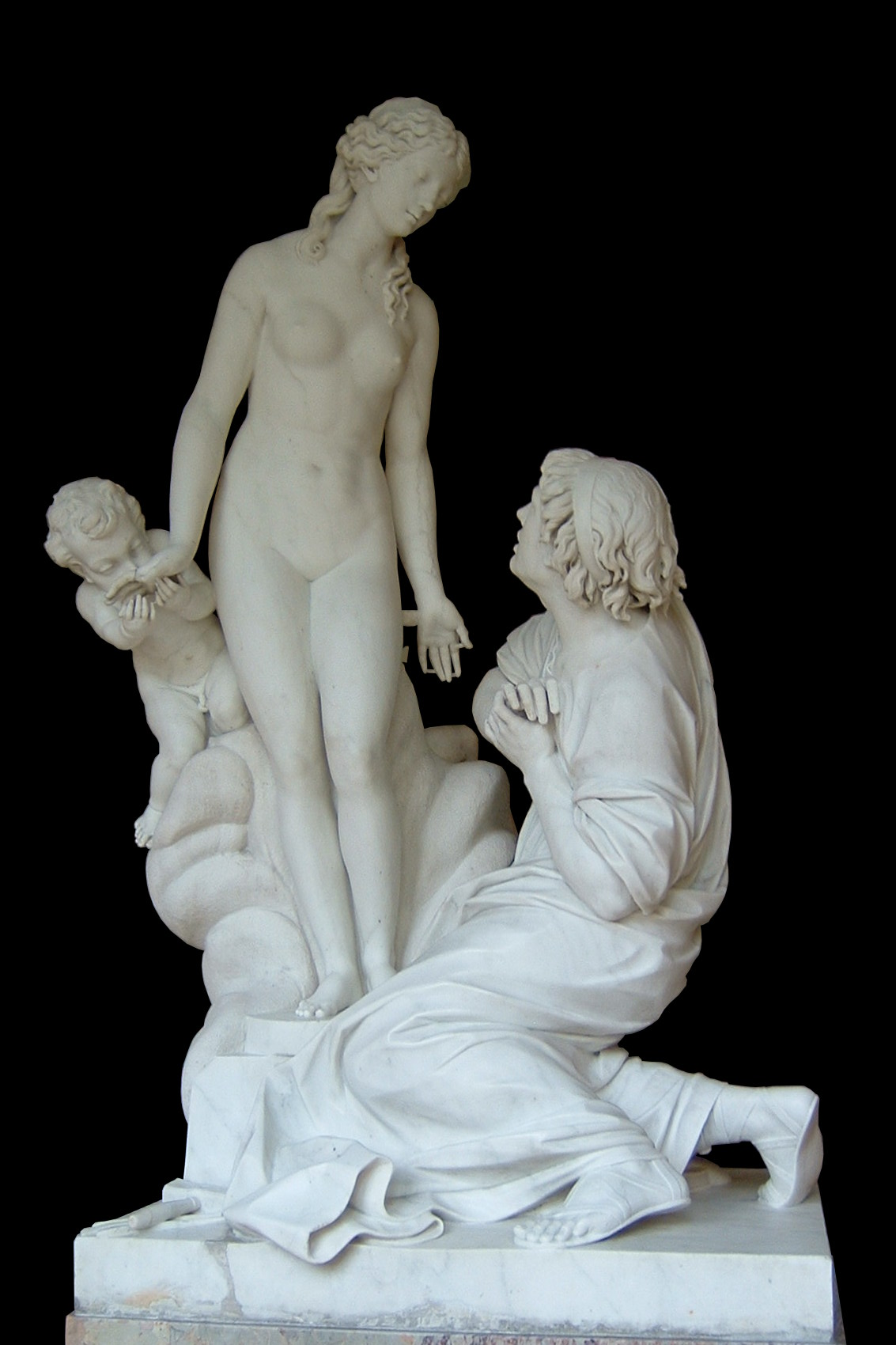
Pygmalion and Galatee, Hermitage Museum

He remained at the Sèvres post until he was invited to Russia by Catherine the Great in September 1766. At St Petersburg he executed a colossal statue of Peter the Great in bronze, known as the Bronze Horseman, together with his pupil and then daughter-in-law Marie-Anne Collot. In 1788, back in Paris, he became Assistant Rector of the Académie royale de peinture et de sculpture. Many of Falconet's religious works, commissioned for churches, were destroyed at the time of the French Revolution. His work on private commissions fared better.

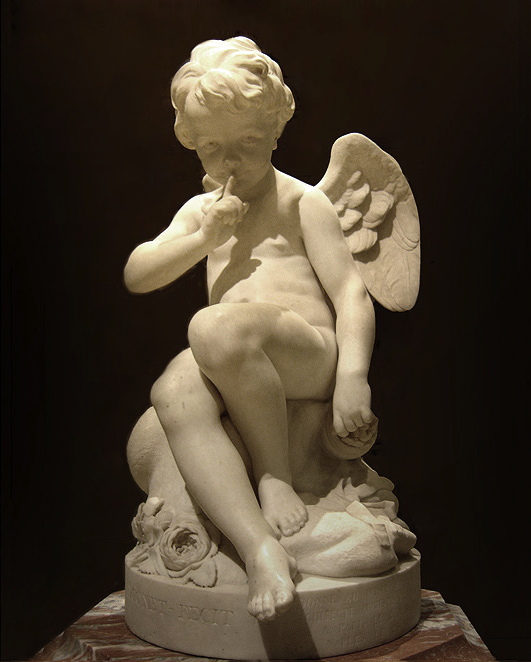
Seated cupid ('Amour menaçant'), original at Rijksmuseum, Amsterdam

He found time to study Greek and Latin, and also wrote several essays on art: Denis Diderot confided to him the chapter on "Sculpture" in the Encyclopédie, released separately by Falconet as Réflexions sur la sculpture in 1768. Three years later, he published Observations sur la statue de Marc-Aurèle, which may be interpreted as the artistic program for his statue of Peter the Great. Falconet's writings on art, his Oeuvres littéraires, came to six volumes when they were first published, at Lausanne, in 1781–1782. His extensive correspondence with Diderot, where he argued that the artist works out of inner necessity rather than for future fame, and that with Empress Catherine the Great of Russia reveal a great deal about his work and his beliefs about art.

Falconet's somewhat prettified and too easy charm incurred the criticism of the Encyclopædia Britannica's eleventh edition: "His artistic productions are characterized by the same defects as his writings, for though manifesting considerable cleverness and some power of imagination, they display in many cases a false and fantastic taste, the result, most probably, of an excessive striving after originality."

Hermann Göring stole Falconet's Friendship of the Heart from the Rothschild collection at Paris for the art collection of his Carinhall hunting lodge.

In 2001/2002, when the Musée de Céramique at Sèvres mounted an exhibition of Falconet's production for Sèvres, 1757–1766, its subtitle was "l'art de plaire" ("the art of pleasing").

== Family ==
The painter Pierre-Étienne Falconet (1741–1791) was his son. A draftsman and engraver, he provided illustrations to his father's entry on "Sculpture" for the Diderot Encyclopédie.

== Sources ==
- "Фальконэ, Этьен-Морис" . Brockhaus and Efron Encyclopedic Dictionary (in Russian). 1906.
