= Peter Falconet =

French portrait painter (1741–1791)

Pierre-Étienne Falconet
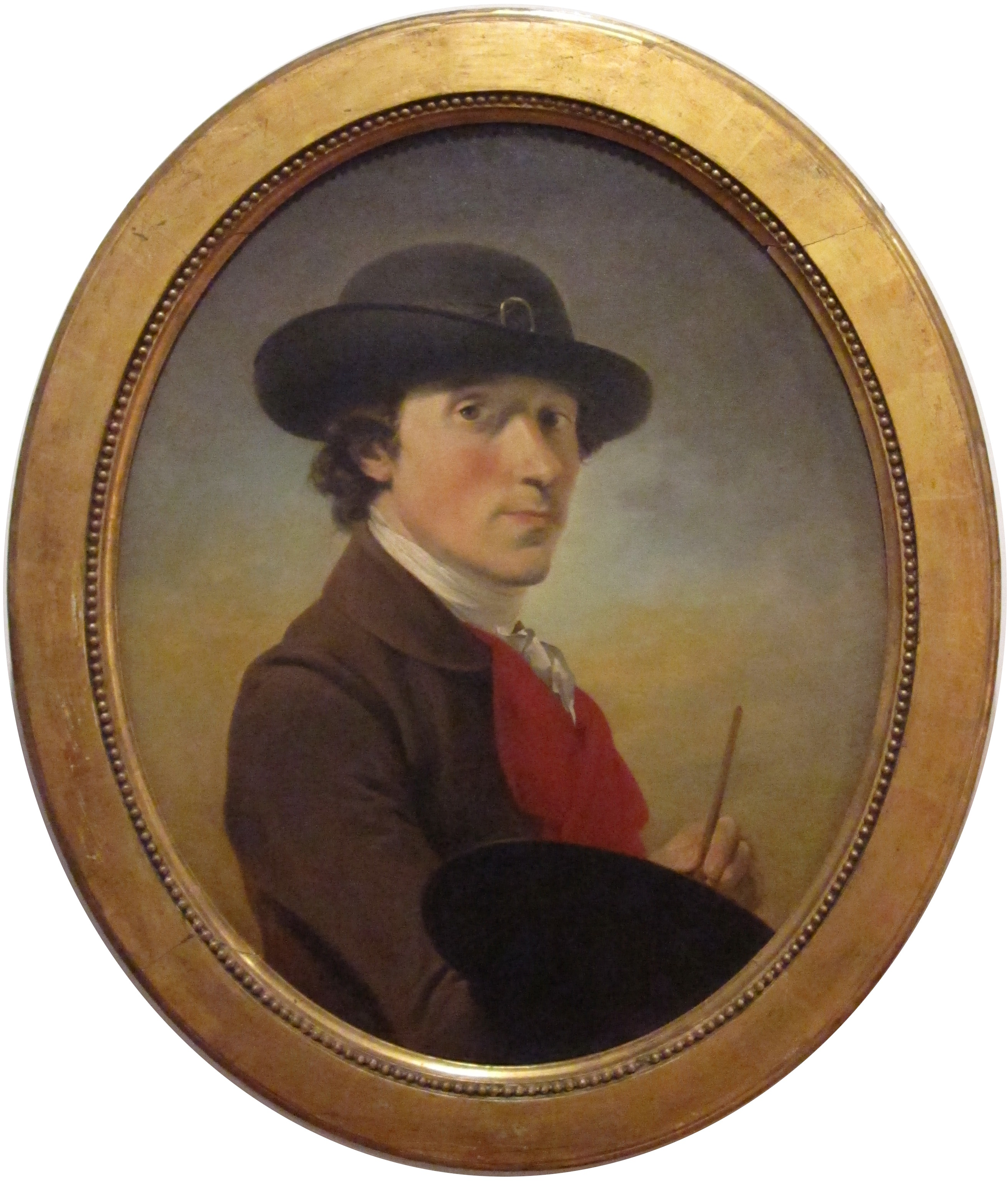
- Self-Portrait, c. 1770; Museum of Fine Arts of Nancy. It depicts an early example of the 18th century prototypes of the top hat.
- Born: Pierre-Étienne Falconet; 1741; Paris, France
- Died: 1791 (aged 49–50); Paris, France
- Education: French Academy
- Known for: Portrait painting
- Spouse: Marie-Anne Collot (m. 1777)

Pierre-Étienne Falconet, also known in English sources as Peter Falconet (1741–1791), was a French painter and draughtsman during the Age of Enlightenment, known for his portraits.

== Life ==
Falconet was born in Paris, the sole surviving son of the sculptor Etienne Maurice Falconet. His first studies were probably in the Académie Royale, but his father, who was friendly with Joshua Reynolds, sent his son to England to work under the painter's direction. He came to London about 1766, in which year he obtained a premium of twenty guineas for a painting in chiaroscuro; in 1768 he gained another of twenty-six guineas for an historical composition. He was a member of the Incorporated Society of Artists, and contributed to their exhibitions from 1767 to 1773, and occasionally to the Royal Academy, mostly portraits.

Some time after 1773 Falconet returned to France, and married Marie-Anne Collot, his father's assistant, and herself a sculptor. He continued to paint, and died in Paris in 1791.

== Works ==
Falconet is best known in England by a set of portraits of eminent artists, drawn in profile in blacklead, with a slight tint of colour on the cheeks; these were engraved in the dotted manner by D. P. Pariset, and also by Burnet Reading. Many of his other portraits were engraved, among them being: Horace Walpole, James Granger, Viscount Nuneham, the Earl and Countess of Marchmont and their son, Lord Polwarth, Hugh Percy, 1st Duke of Northumberland, Christian VII of Denmark, all engraved by Pariset; Elizabeth, Countess of Harcourt, Elizabeth, Countess of Ancrum, Mrs. Green and her son, and others engraved in mezzotint by Valentine Green; others were engraved by Hibbert, James Watson, John Dixon, Gabriel Smith, and J. F. Bause. There is a small engraving, from a design by Falconet, representing the interior of his father's studio. He also engraved himself some designs of François Boucher.

His daughter, Madame Jankowitz, bequeathed a collection of his works to the Museum at Nancy, comprising portraits of himself and family, pictures and drawings, besides some plaster busts by his wife, including one of Falconet himself. He decorated a Chinese temple for Lady de Grey at Wrest in Bedfordshire.

== Selected works ==
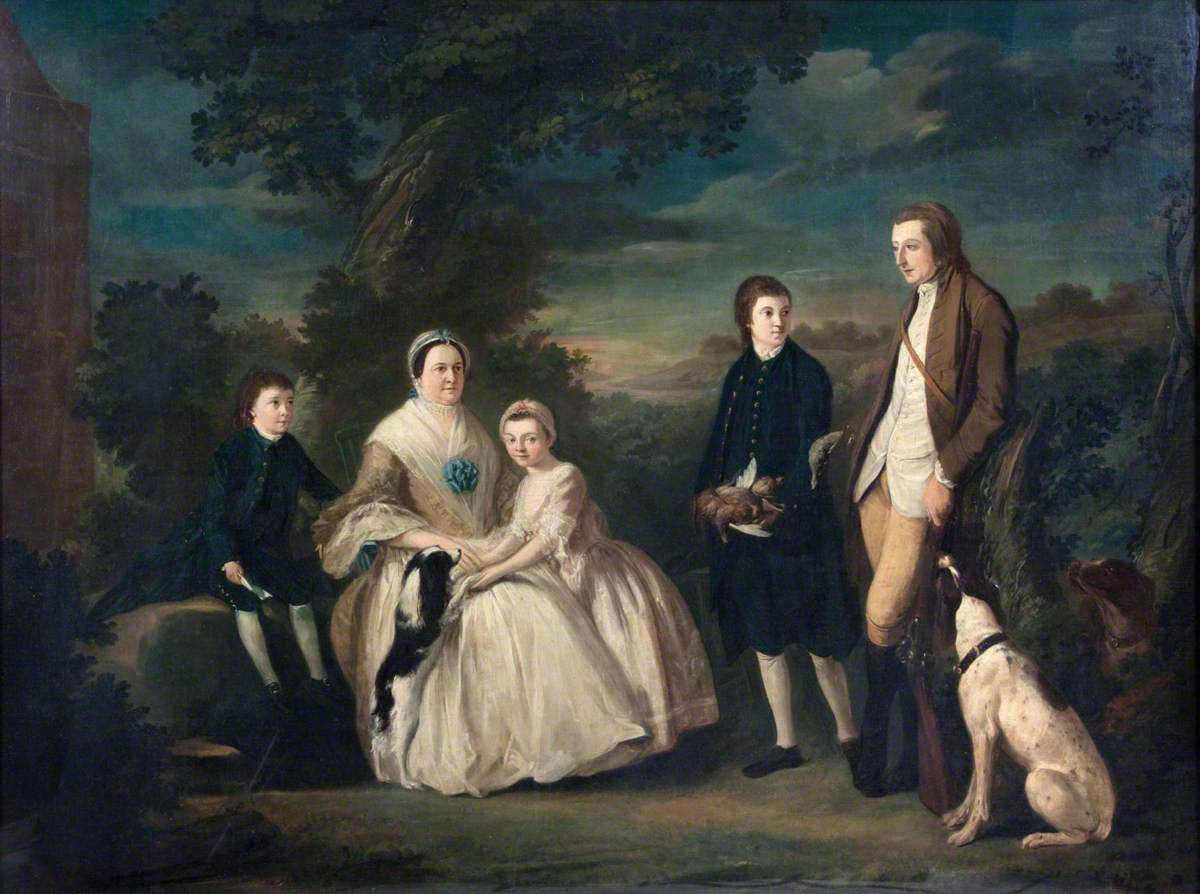
The Tudor Family, 1766; National Museum Cardiff

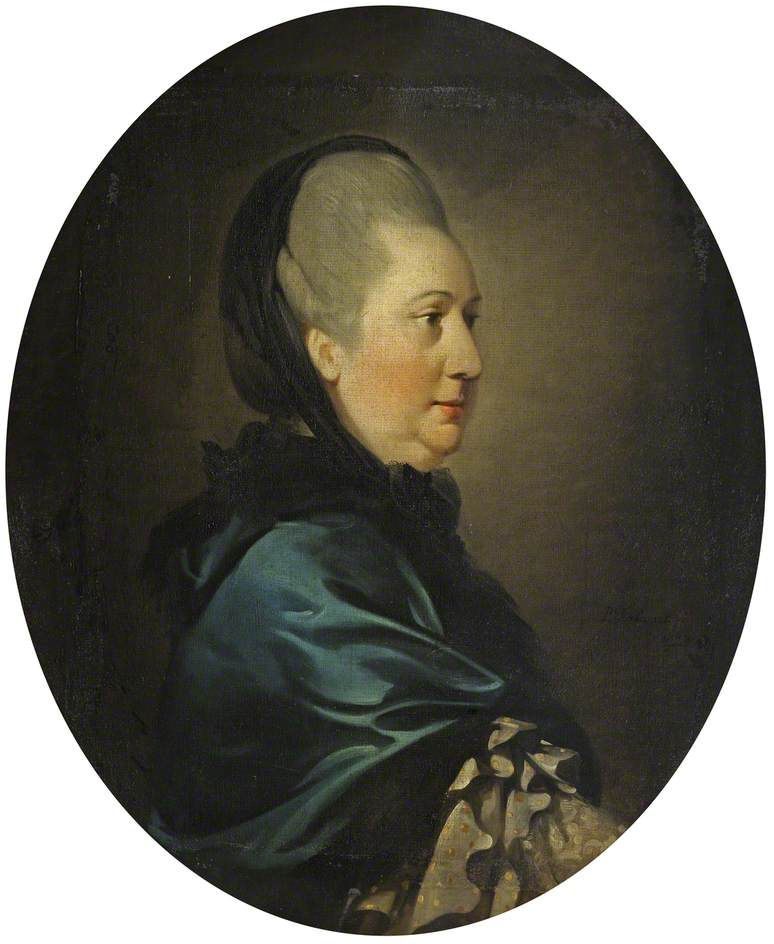
Henrietta Speed, 1768; Pembroke College, Oxford

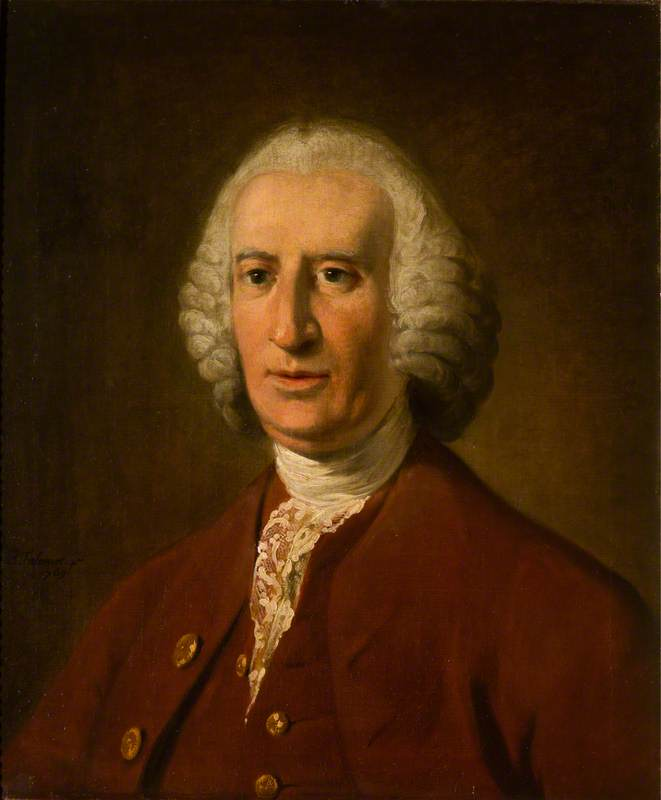
Hugh Hume-Campbell, 3rd Earl of Marchmont, 1769; National Galleries of Scotland

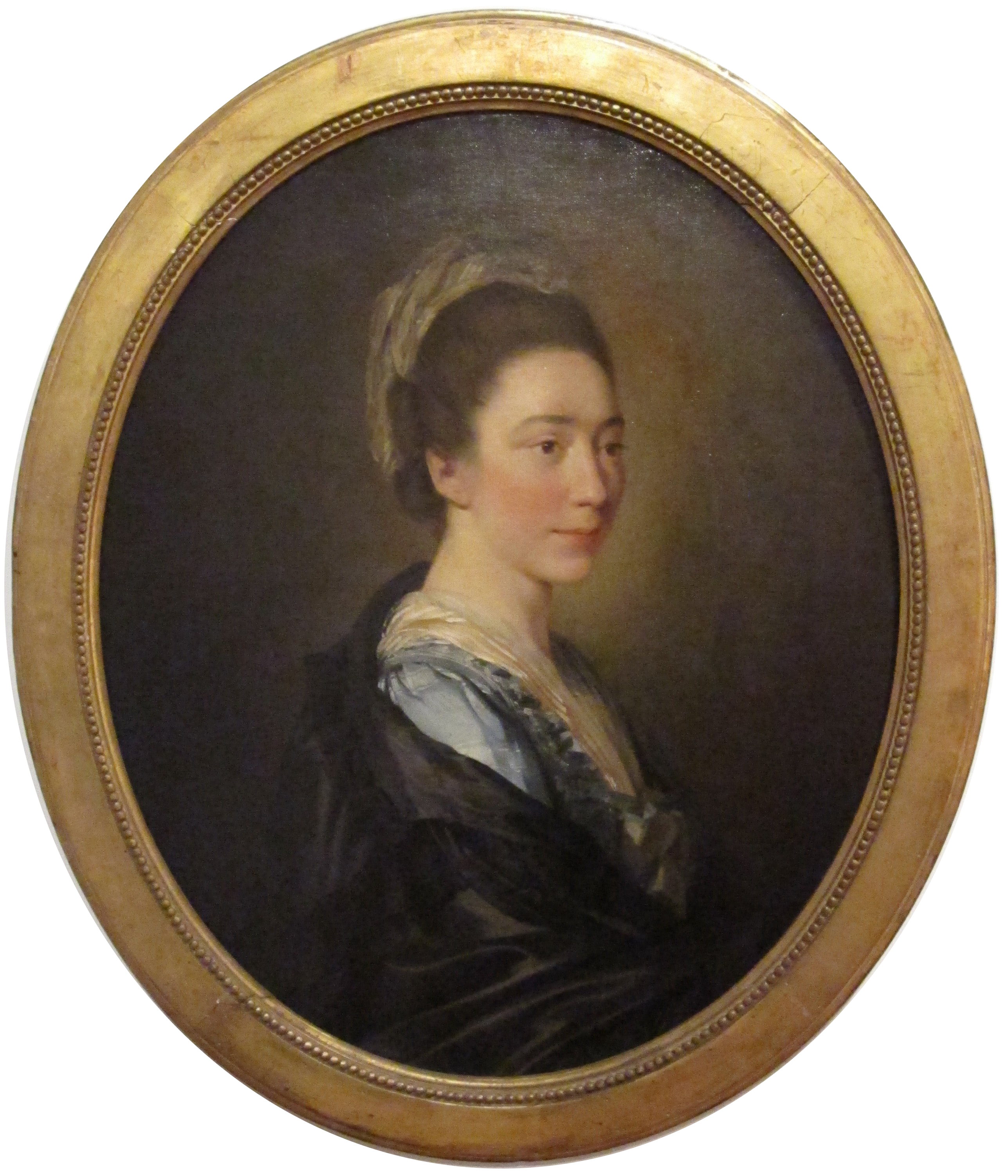
Marie-Anne Collot, the painter's spouse, 1773; Museum of Fine Arts of Nancy

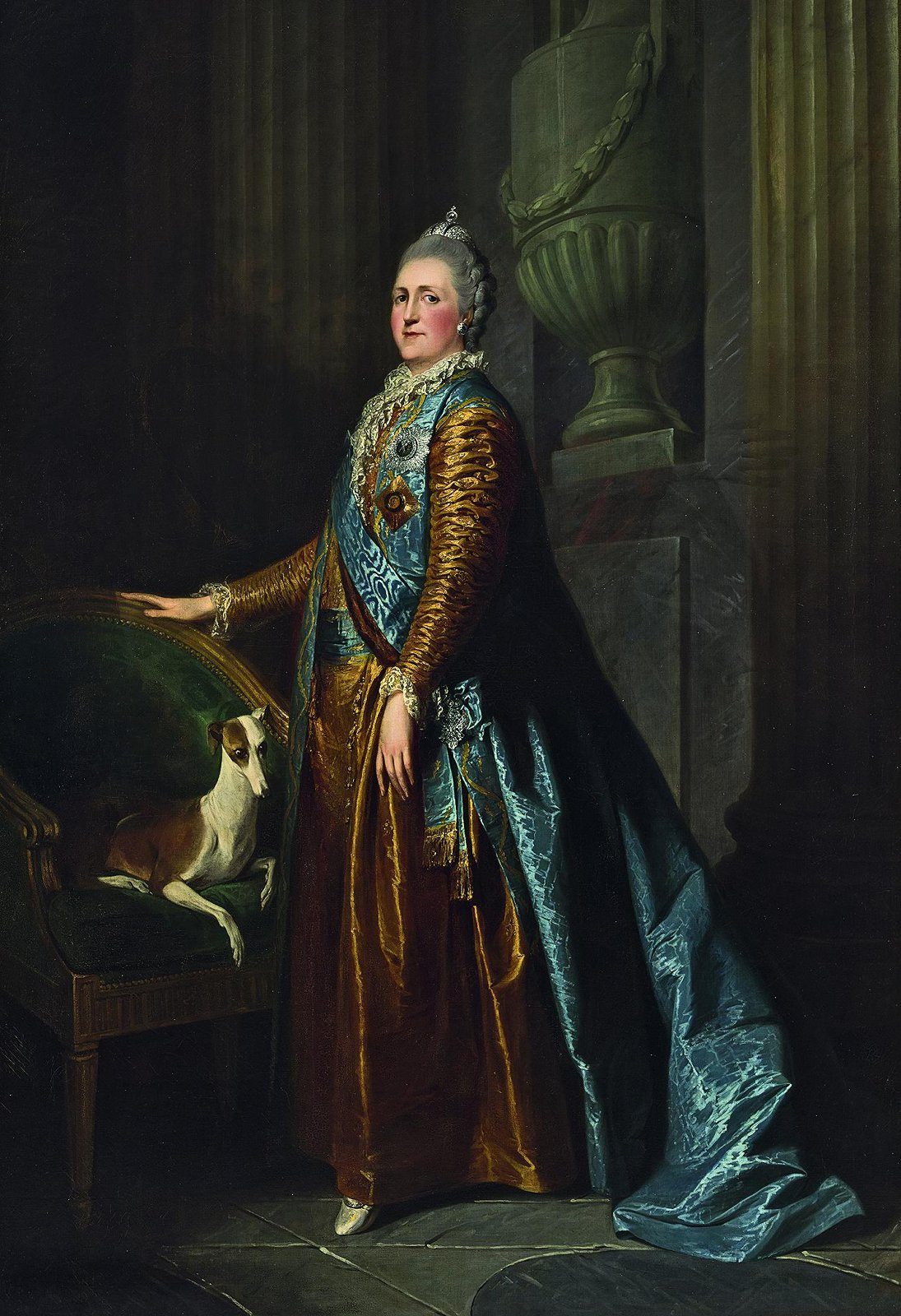
Catherine the Great, 1773; Hermitage Museum

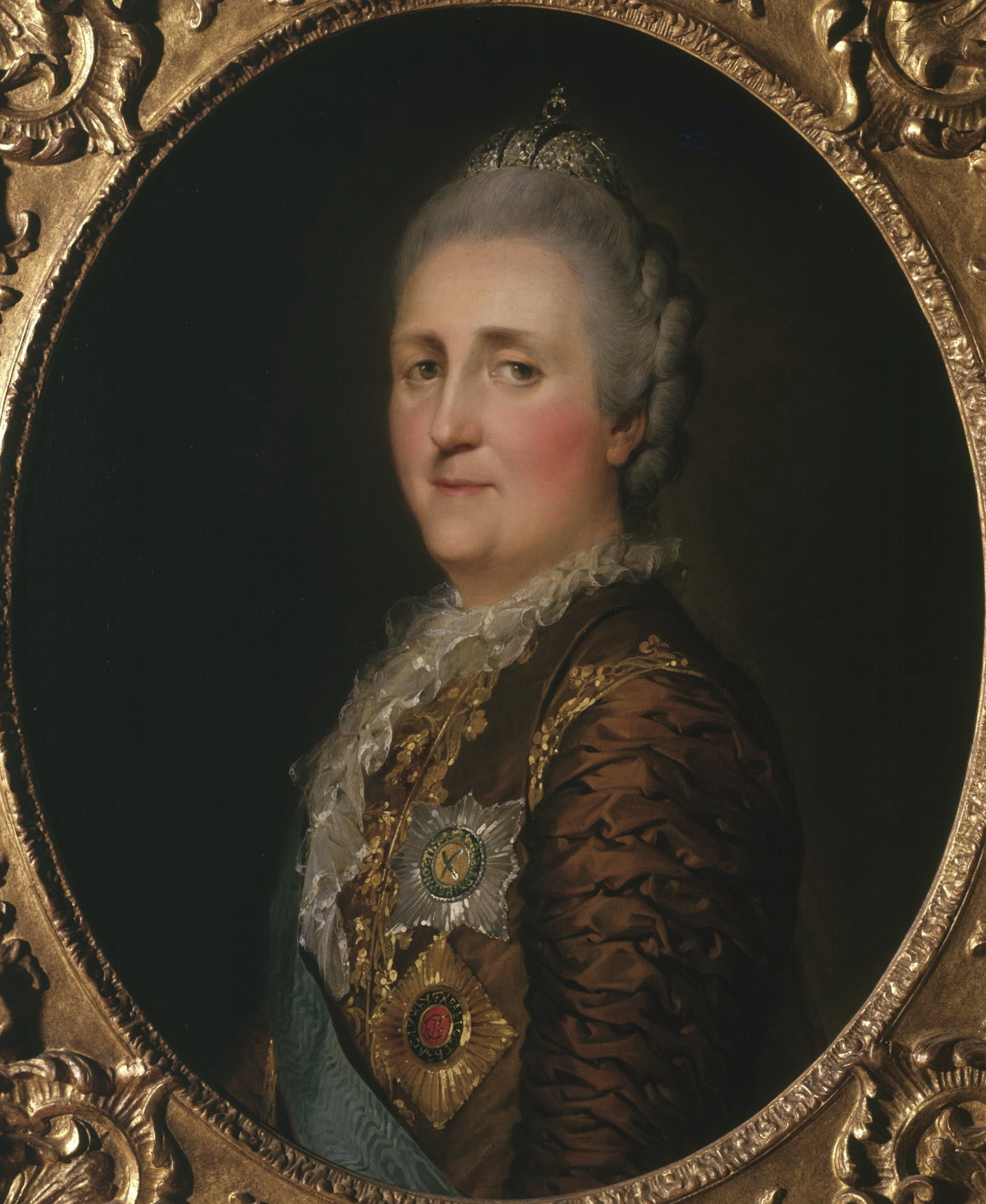
Catherine the Great, 1773, likely a preparatory work to the prior; Hillwood Museum

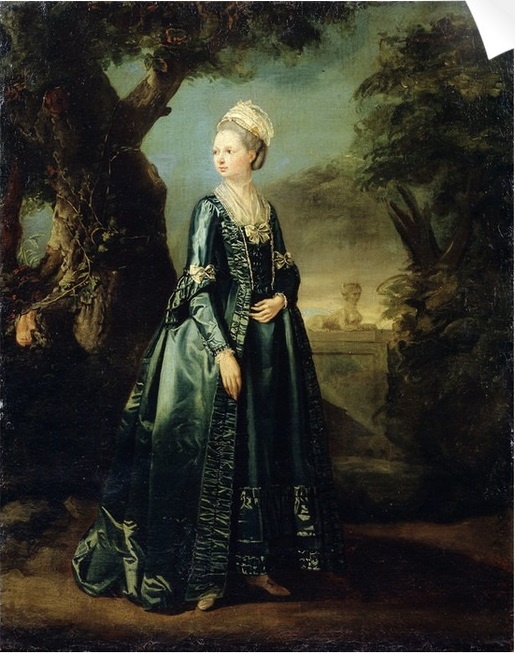
Grand Duchess Natalia Alexeievna of Russia, 1773; Pushkin Museum

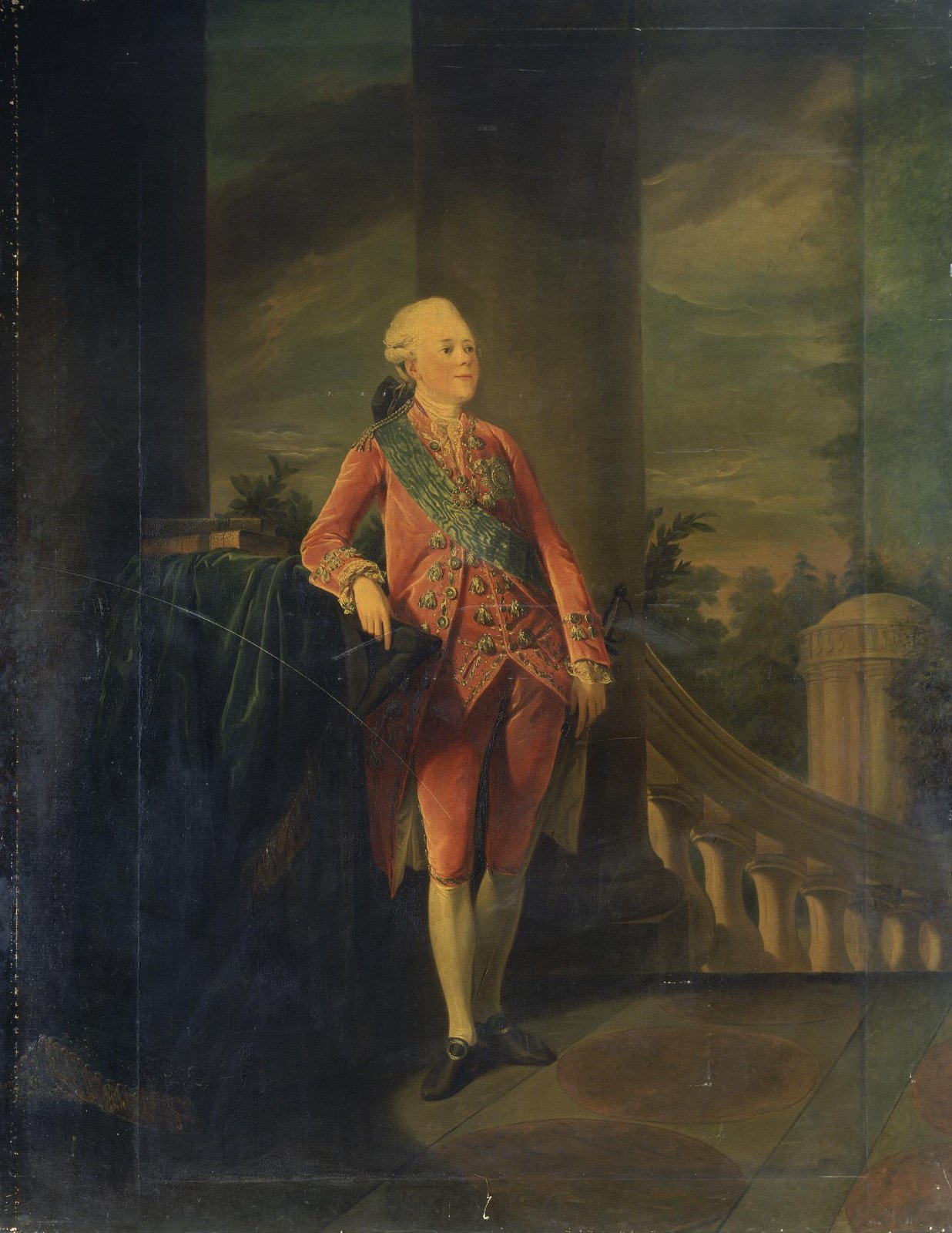
Grand Duke Pavel Petrovich of Russia, c. 1773–1774; Hermitage Museum

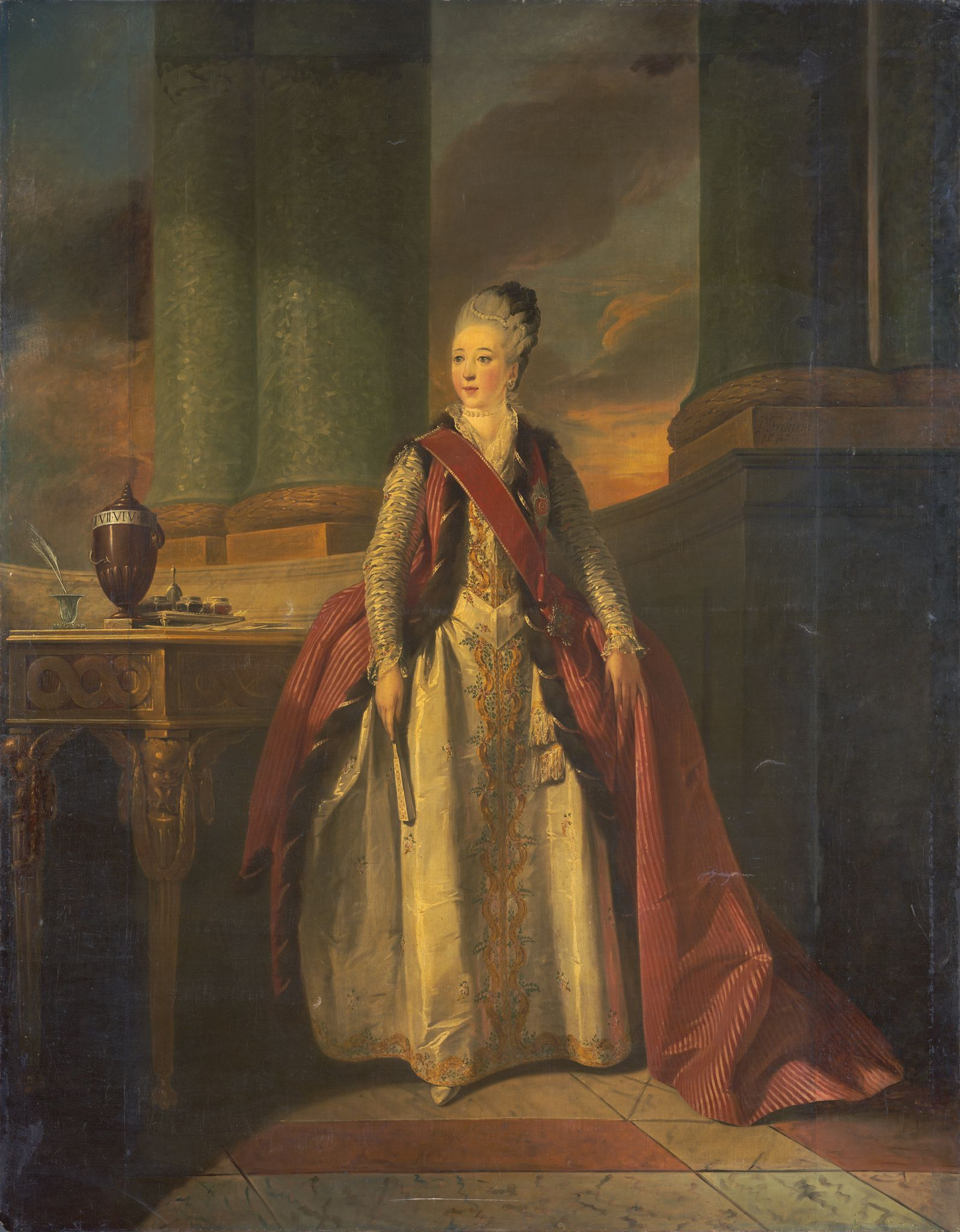
Grand Duchess Natalia Alexeievna of Russia, c. 1773–1774, pendant piece to the prior work; Tretyakov Gallery
