= Pair of Flintlock Pistols of Empress Catherine the Great (Metropolitan Museum of Art) =

Pair of flintlock pistols

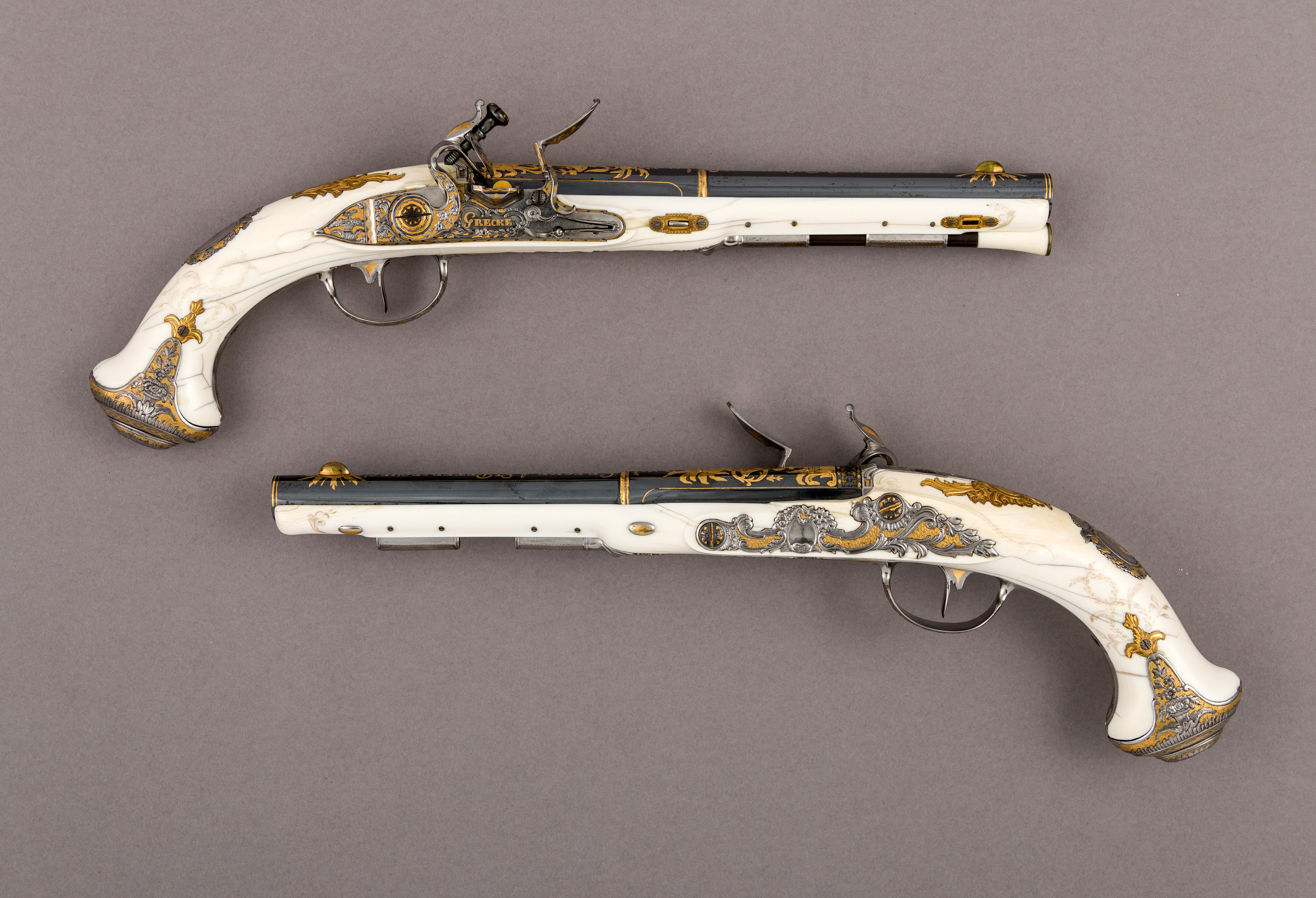
- Artist: Johan Adolph Grecke
- Year: 1786
- Medium: Steel, ivory, gold, brass
- Dimensions: 36.8 cm (14.5 in)
- Location: Metropolitan Museum of Art

The Metropolitan Museum of Art holds a pair of late 18th century flintlock pistols belonging to Catherine the Great in its collection. Made from steel, brass and adorned with ivory and gold, the pistols are currently on display in Gallery 375.

== Description ==
The flintlock pistols were made by Russian gunsmith Johan Adolph Grecke, who operated a workshop in the imperial capital of St. Petersburg. Grecke was employed by the imperial court to produce a number of ornately decorated firearms, including the pair of pistols in question. Grecke notably continued to produce firearms with ivory stocks long after the style had fallen out of vogue in the rest of Europe. The pistols were originally part of a garniture that included a hunting rifle, a fowling piece (a shotgun), and said pair of pistols. This set was eventually split up; the hunting rifle was given to Stanislas Poniatowski and later lost, while the fowling piece is in the collection of the National Museum, Warsaw. The pair of pistols was gifted to Metropolitan Museum of Art in 1986 by American banker John M. Schiff in memory of his wife, Edith Baker Schiff.

The pistols' barrels are made from gun-quality steel, and their stocks are made from carved ivory. The bodies of the firearms are decorated with brass gold, as are the grips. In addition, the escutcheons on the weapon's grips bear an E for Ekaterine, Catherine the Great's name in Russian.
