= Sauce boat =

Low lipped vessel in which sauce is served

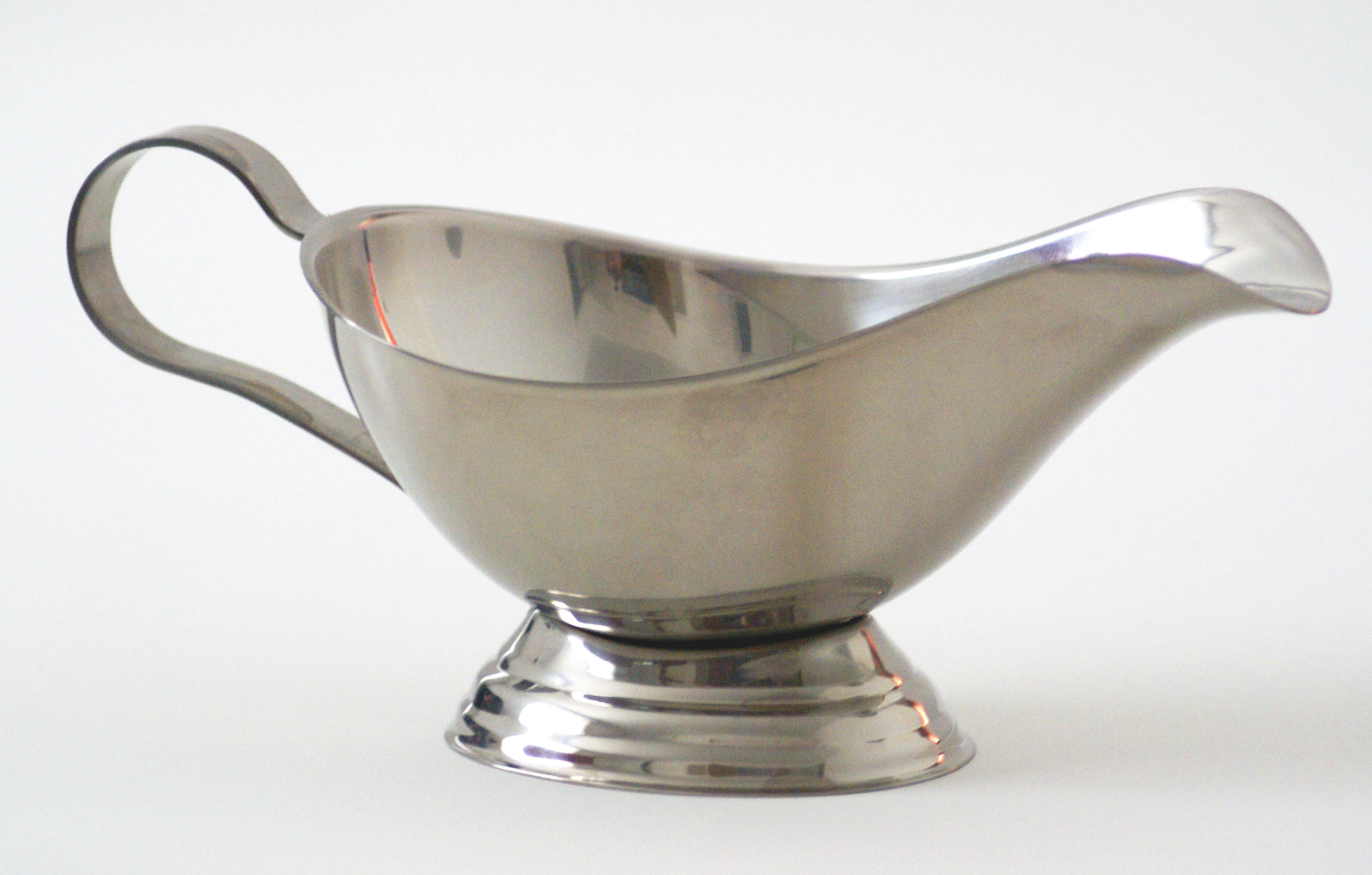
A stainless steel sauce boat.

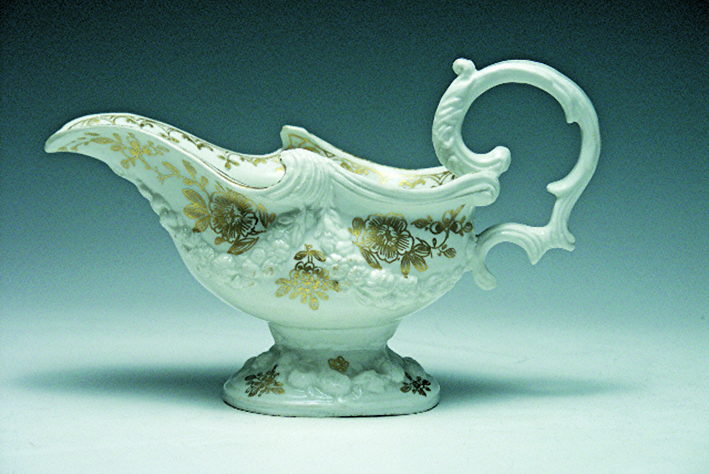
A Bow porcelain sauce boat in rococo silver style, ca. 1750.

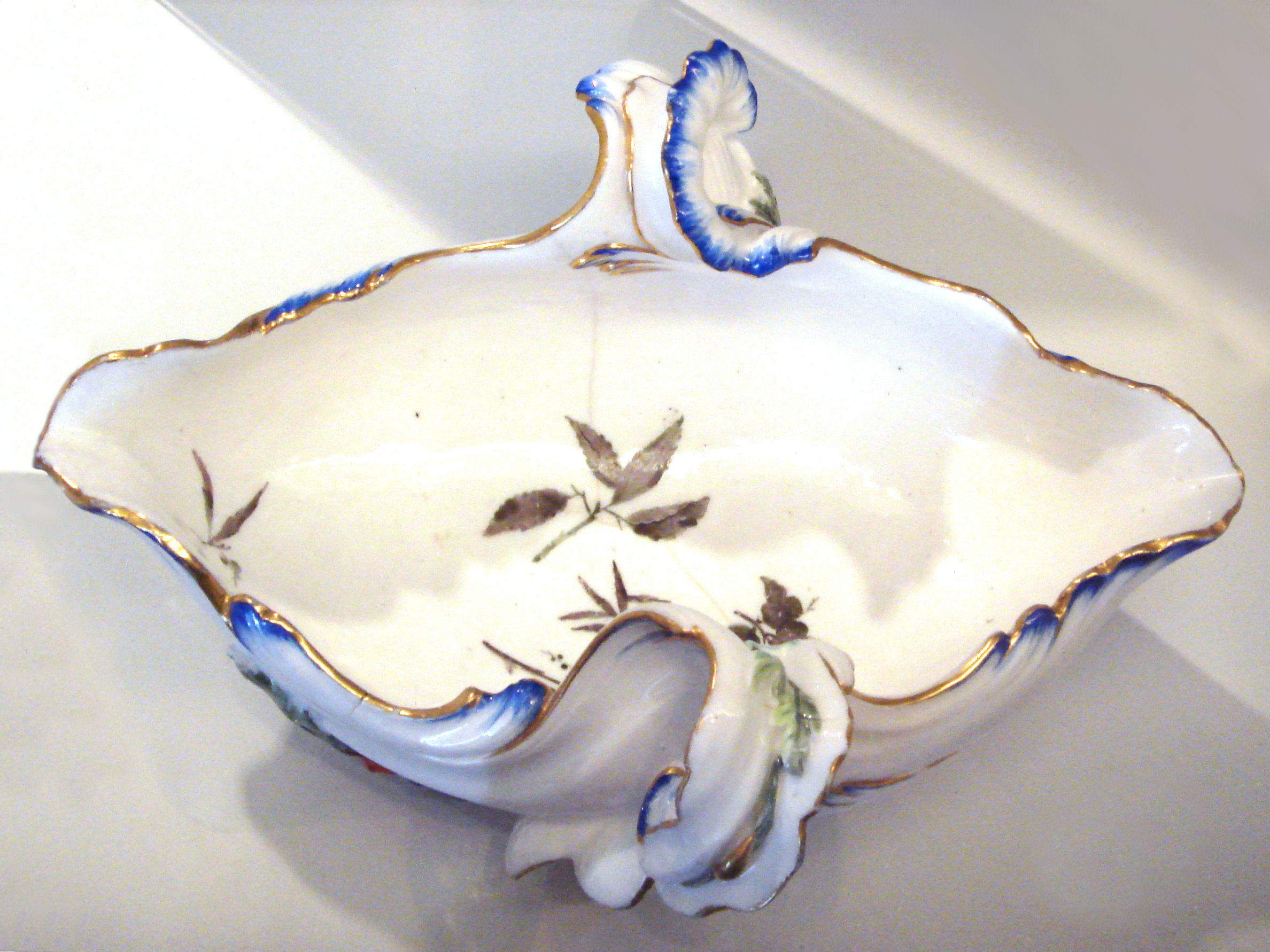
Vincennes porcelain sauce boat by Jean-Claude Chambellan Duplessis, Vincennes, 1756.

A sauce boat, gravy boat, or saucière is a low jug or pitcher with a handle in which sauce or gravy is served. The typical shape is considered boat-like, hence the name. It often sits on a matching saucer, sometimes attached to the pitcher, to catch dripping sauce.

Some gravy boats also function as gravy separators, with a spout that pours from the bottom of the container, thus leaving any surface-floating fat in the container.

== History ==
While some vessels have been identified as being used for sauces since ancient times, the modern fashion for sauce boats probably derived from fashion in the late 17th century French court. Silver sauce boats with two handles and two spouts were reported as early as 1690 and appear to have developed in response to the new and original nouvelle cuisine. French fashion was highly influential in 18th century England where such sauce boats were copied in English silver, and from the 1740s, in English porcelain.

Sauceboats became an important product for English porcelain factories, particularly as Chinese export porcelain wares were uninspiring. Consequently, the earliest factories, such as Bow, Chelsea, Limehouse, Lunds Bristol, and Worcester, all had sauce boats in their product range.

During the second half of the 18th century, the elaborate early porcelain sauce boat designs were simplified in response to the growing market among the aspiring middle classes. A wide variety of designs were produced and the influence of silver diminished somewhat. Few of the early factories manufactured full dinner services, but the new creamware, developed by Wedgwood, lent itself to the manufacture of large plates, always difficult in early porcelain. As a result, the sauce boat became part of a dinner service, which generally it remains today.
