= Sèvres pot-pourri vase in the shape of a ship =

Sèvres pot-pourri vase shape

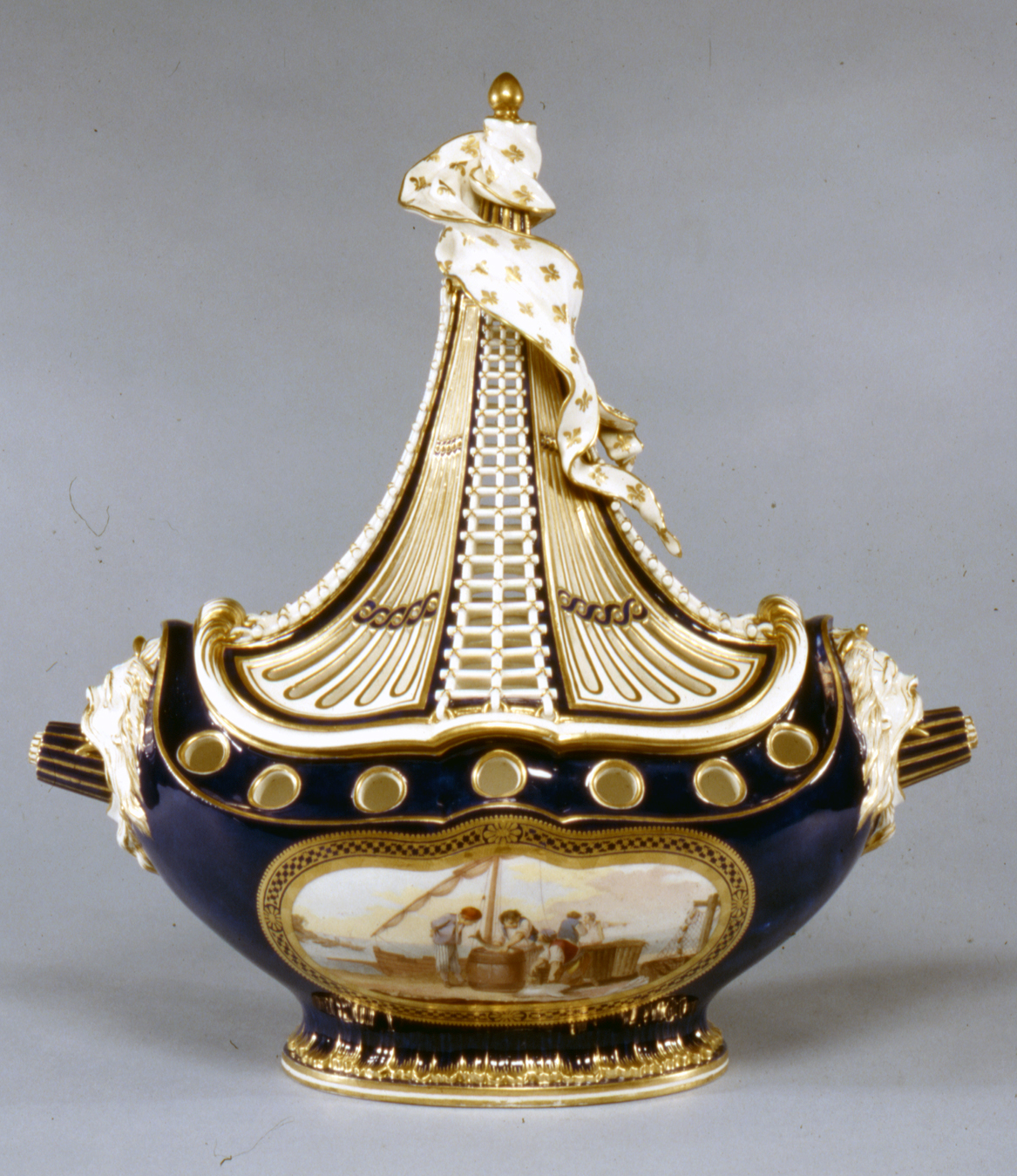
Example in the Walters Art Gallery in Baltimore, 1764 – front

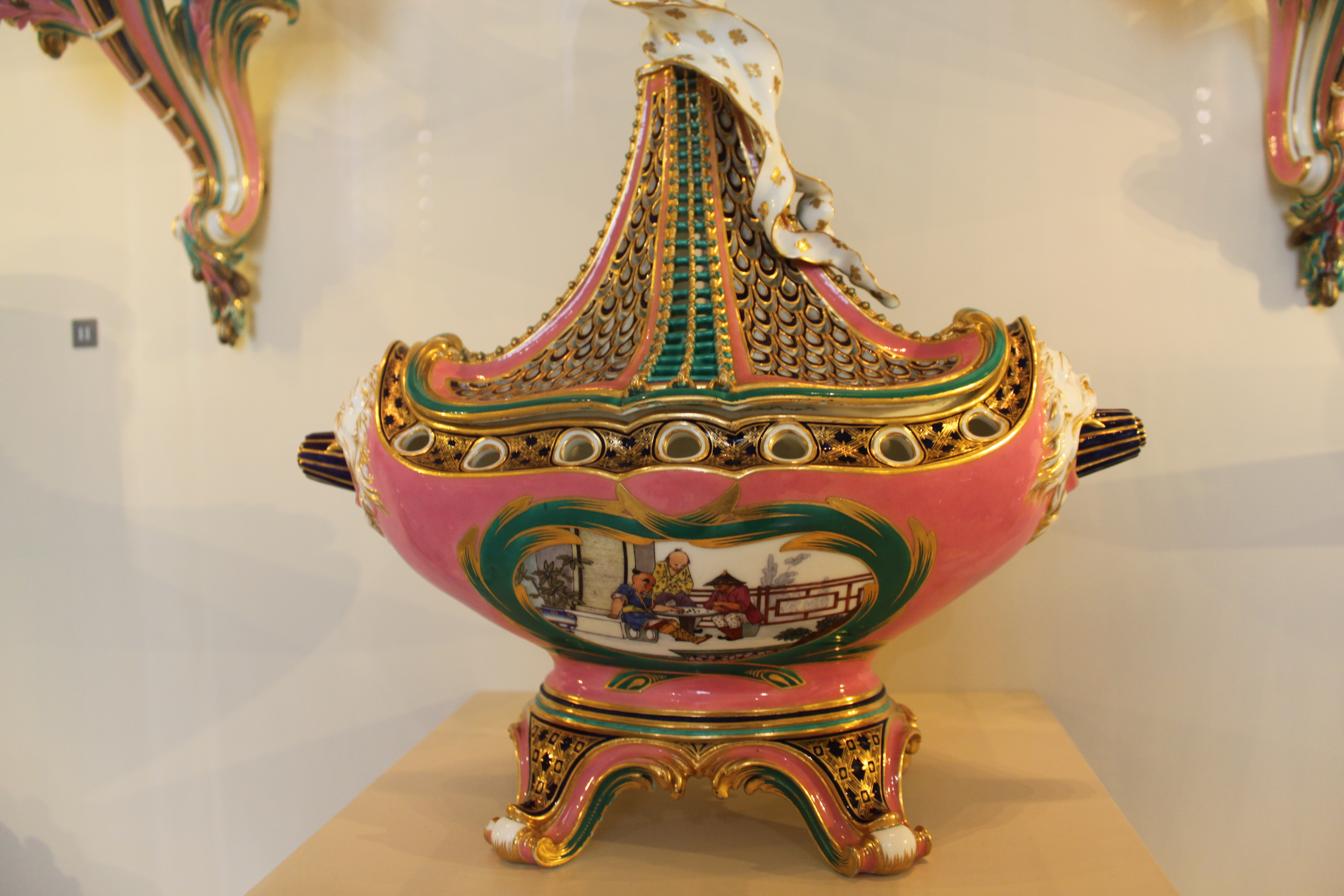
Pot-pourri en vaisseau en troisième grandeur – Vessel potpourri vase, third size – 1760, Louvre

Pot pourri à vaisseau or pot pourri en navire ("pot-pourri holder as a vessel/ship") is the shape used for a number of pot-pourri vases in the form of masted ships, first produced between the late 1750s to the early 1760s by the Sèvres manufactory near Paris. The colours and details of the painted decoration vary between examples, as is typical of Sèvres porcelain, and one example is on a later gilt wood stand. The openwork lid lifts off to allow refilling of the pot-pourri. The shape was eventually produced in two or three versions, at slightly different sizes. It was first designed in 1757, probably by Jean-Claude Duplessis (c. 1695–1774), the artistic director of the factory. The first surviving finished example dates to 1759. Another name for them is vaisseau à mat (masted ship).

These vases are considered to be one of the most famous models introduced by the Manufacture nationale de Sèvres; patrons such as Madame de Pompadour and her brother the Marquis de Marigny collected the form. Among the largest vessels produced by the factory, these vases were extremely difficult to fire; the multiple openwork piercings in the body weakened the overall structure, and they tended to collapse in the kiln. Consequently, only about twelve were ever produced, ten of which survive today.

The shape derives from the nef, a table decoration in the form of a ship, usually of precious metals, used since medieval times. The arms of the City of Paris also showed a ship, and the vases may reflect this. The vase would have held potpourri used to perfume a room. Eighteenth-century ladies made their own, experimenting with various ingredients and sometimes blending essences for as long as nine years. The vases were made to be sold with other vases of different shapes to form a garniture to place on a mantelpiece or side table. The main background colours in different examples range from pink to green and dark blue, and the subjects of the main painted spaces from naval subjects after Dutch painting to chinoiserie genre scenes. The paintings on the rear are mostly flowers, or other inanimate objects, such as the garnish of marine still-life on the Walters' example.

== Versions and copies ==
Sèvres still have some of the moulds, and a plaster model which incorporates features from both sizes. At Sèvres the shape evolved from a vase with no lid, the cuvette à masques, produced from 1754 (earliest example, at Houghton Hall), and the shape of the pot pourri à vaisseau was also used in an adaptation as a lidded tureen with a stand, the terrine gondole from at least 1757 (two in the Hofburg Palace in Vienna), and a different pot pourri gondole.

The popularity of Sèvres porcelain with English collectors in the eighteenth and nineteenth centuries is demonstrated by the presence of all ten known examples of this shape of vase in English collections by the mid-nineteenth century. Today there is one in France, five in the UK and four in the US. The shape was copied, usually in somewhat simplified form, by some other manufacturers, notably the English firm Mintons, who were commissioned to make a replica by Georgina Ward, Countess of Dudley, when her husband sold his original in the 1880s; this is the example now in the Getty Museum.

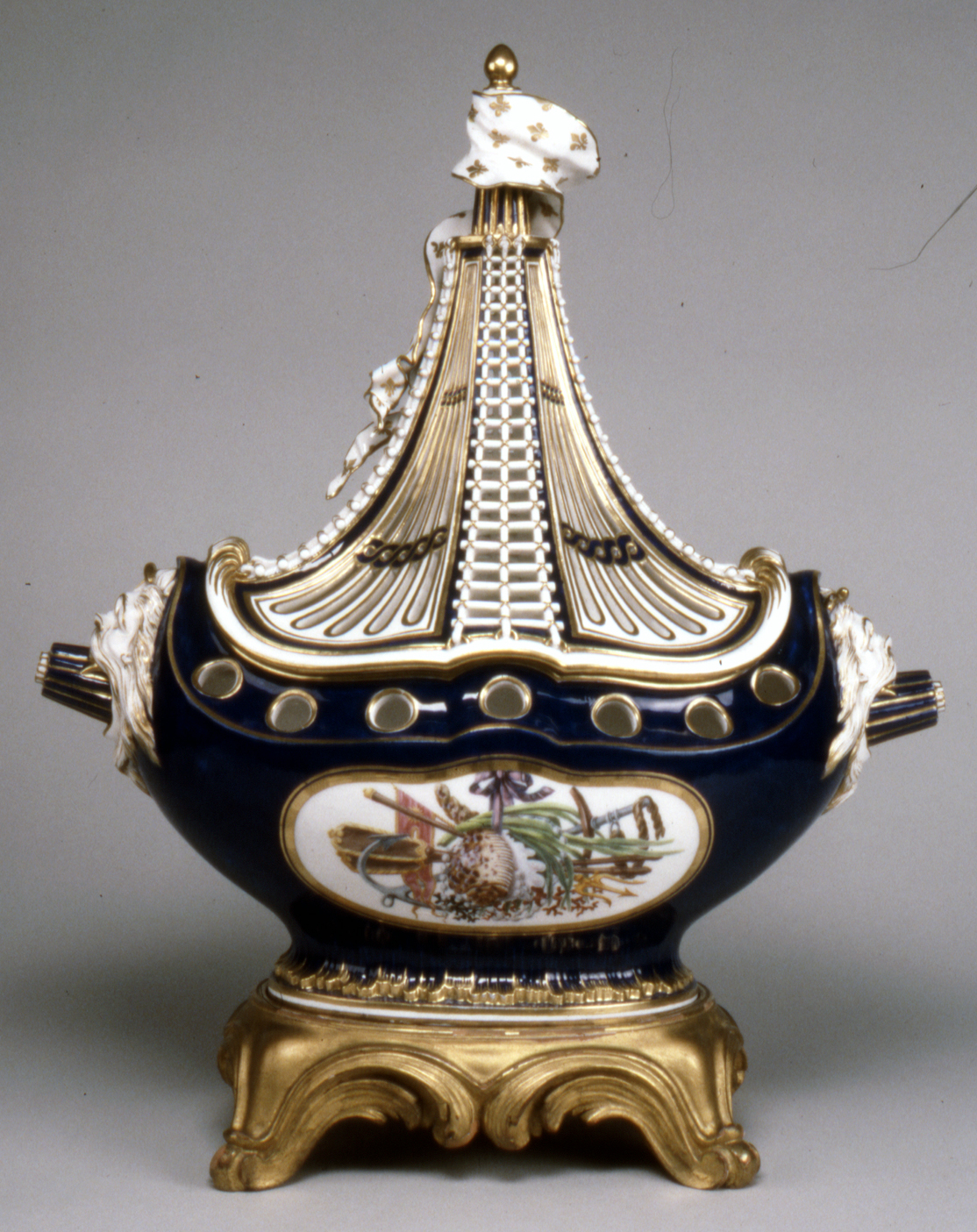
Back of the Walters Art Gallery vase. With later gilt-wood stand.

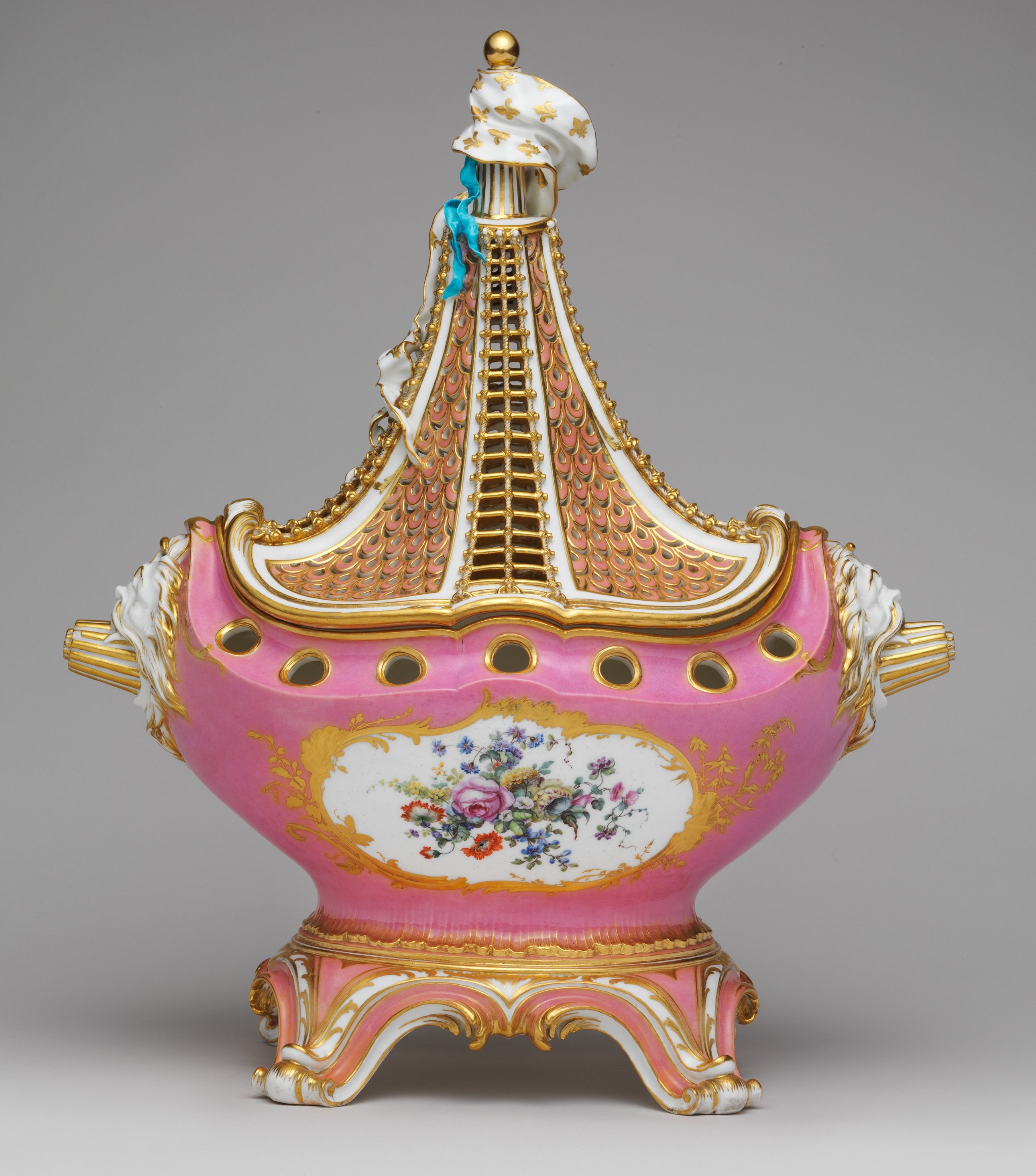
Back of the Metropolitan example

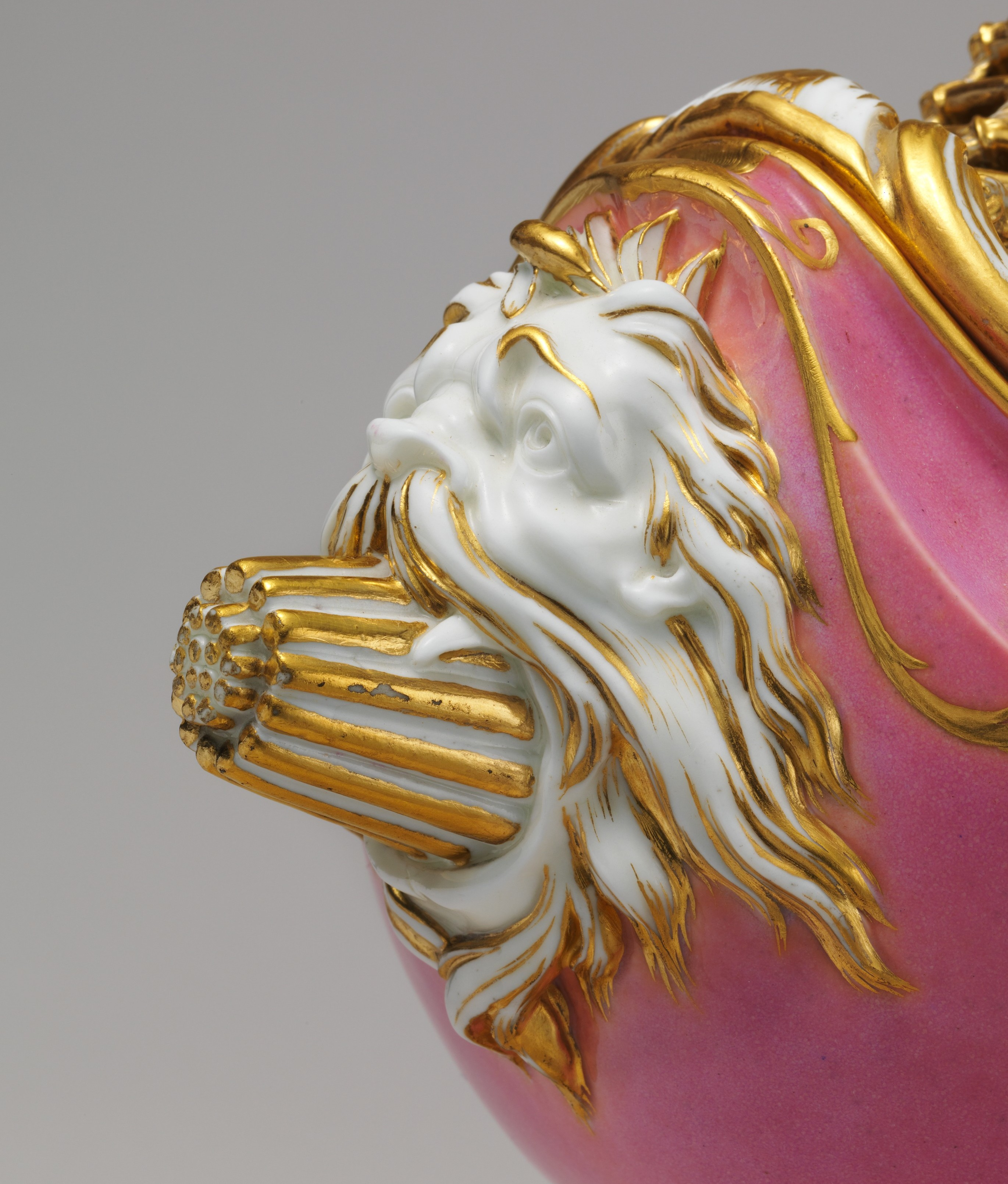
Detail of the Metropolitan example

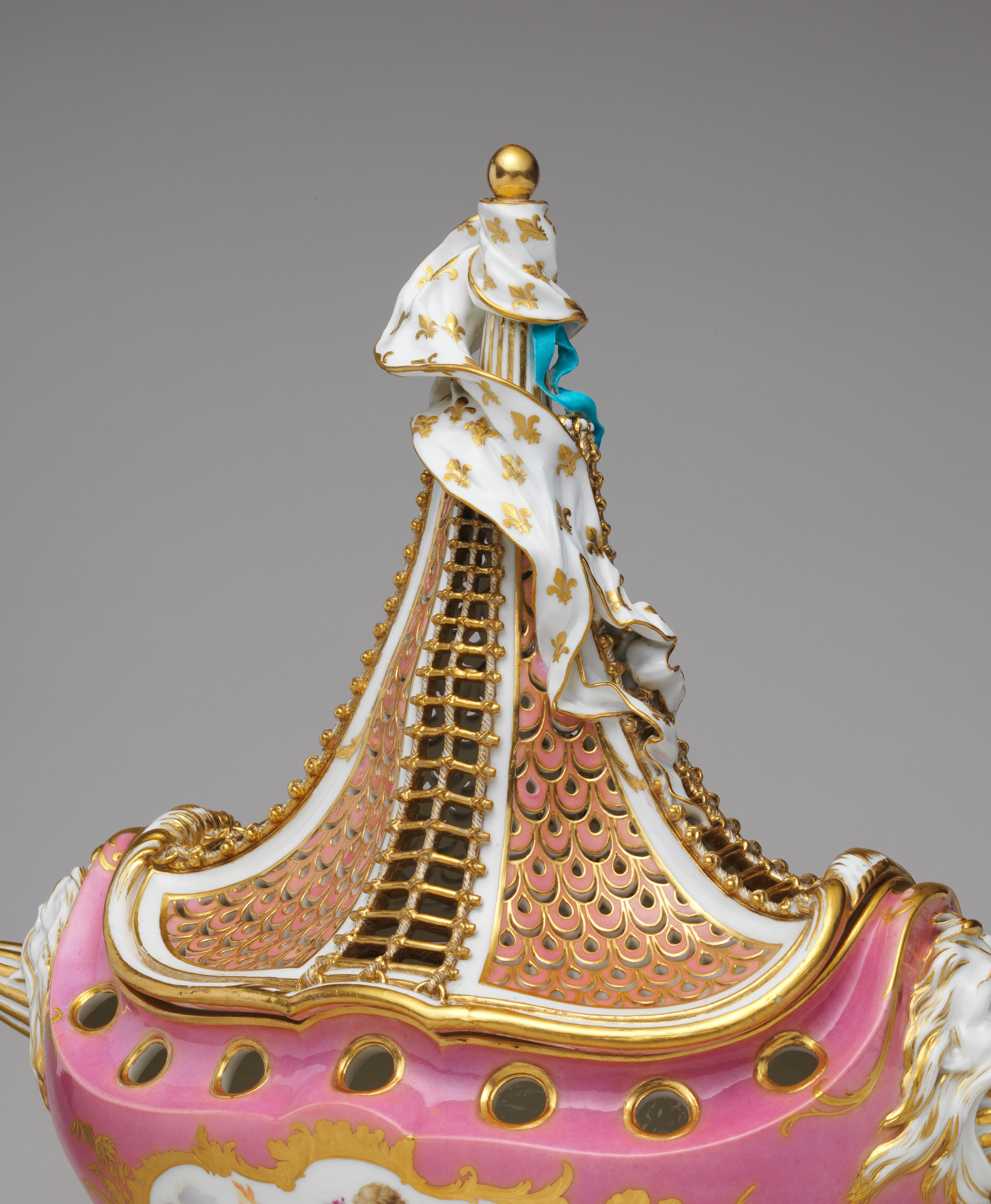
Detail of the Metropolitan example

== Surviving vases ==
=== Waddesdon Manor, Buckinghamshire, England ===
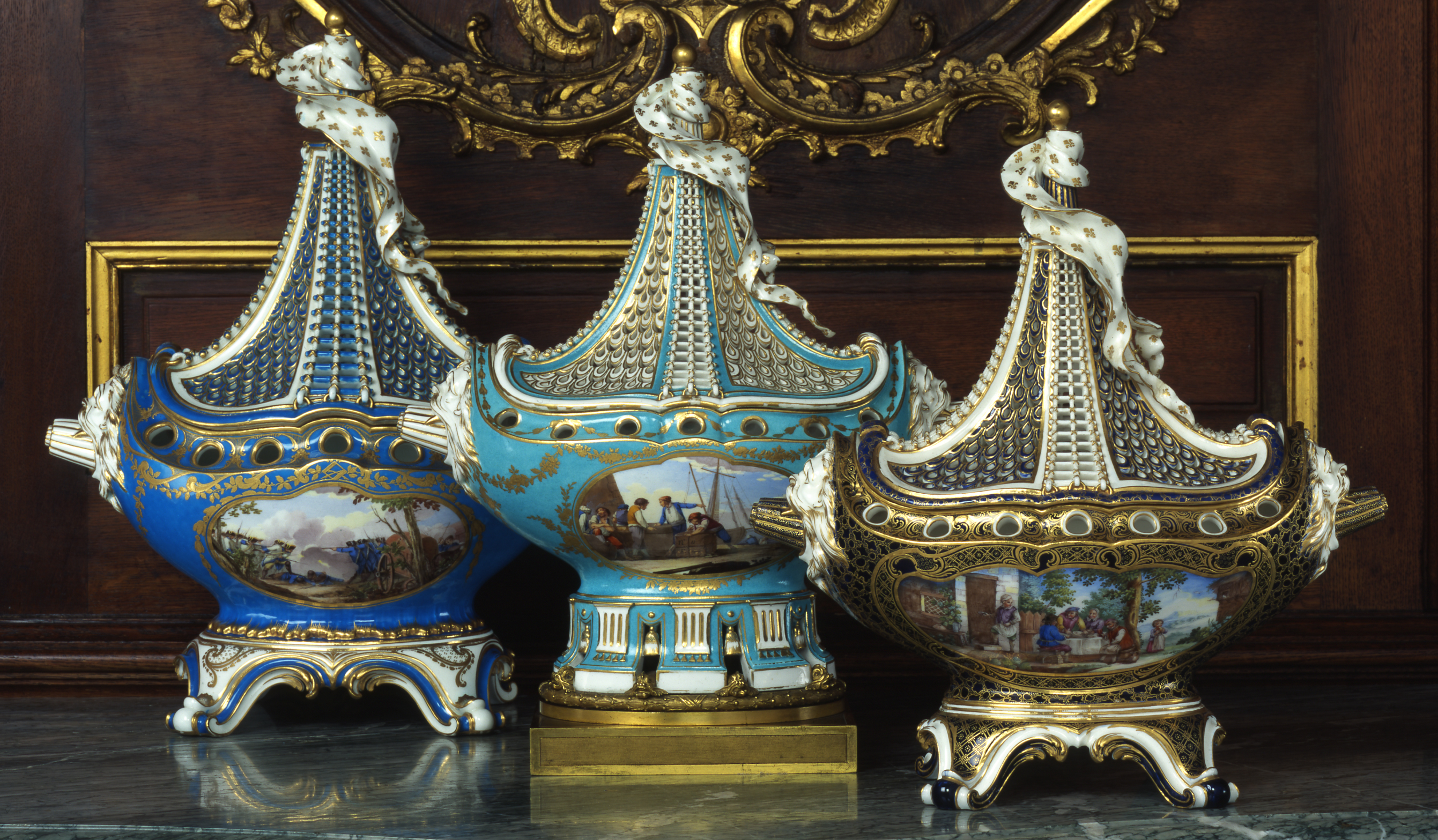
Waddesdon Manor's three vases, about 1761

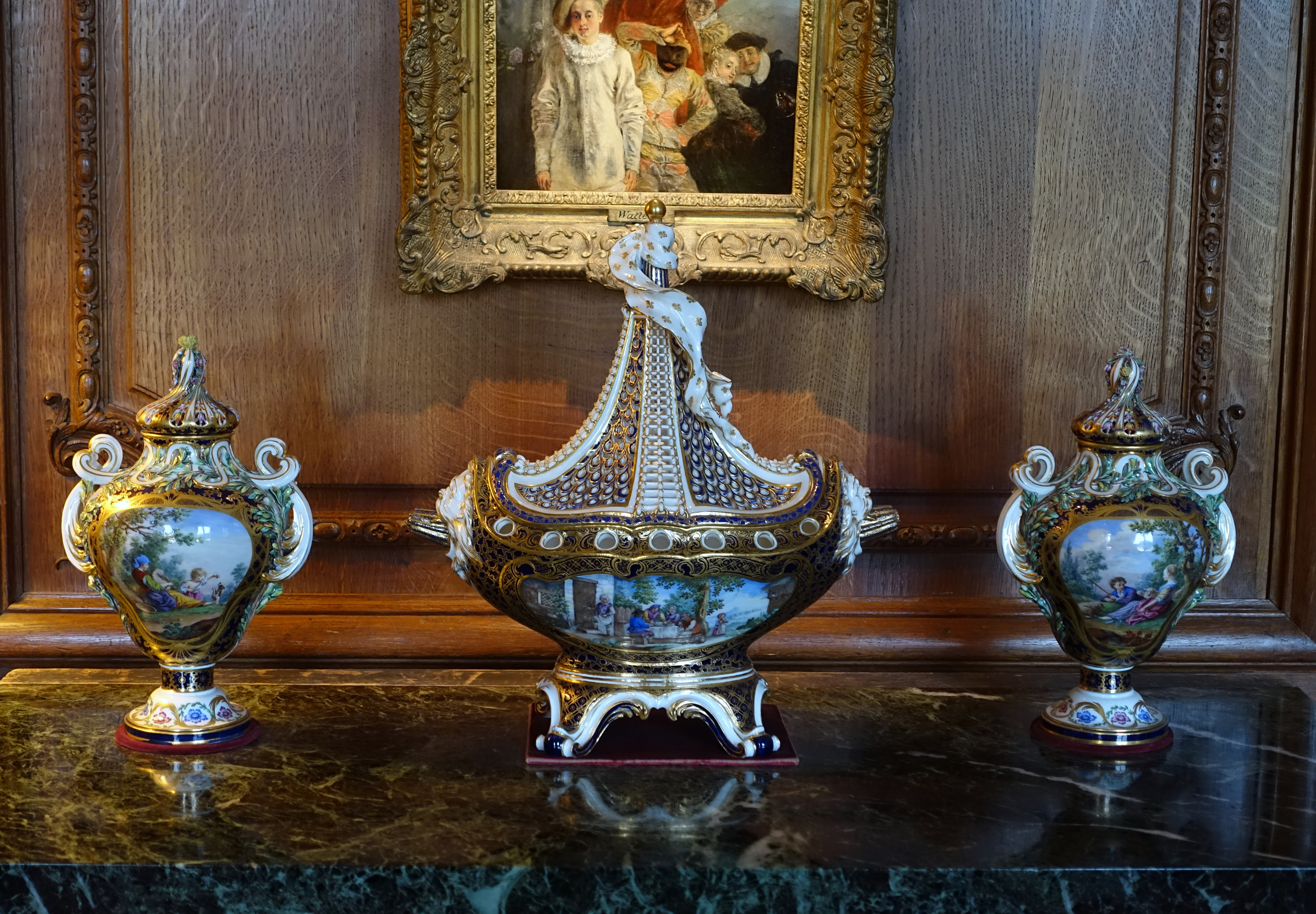
One of the Waddesdon vases in a garniture, as they would normally have been displayed

Of the ten surviving ship vases, three can be seen at Waddesdon Manor in Buckinghamshire. Waddesdon Manor was built in the 1880s by Baron Ferdinand de Rothschild, a keen collector of French decorative arts. The bleu céleste vase was Baron Ferdinand's first important purchase as a collector in 1861. He acquired it from the dealer Alexander Barker and it was said that the vase had been a gift to an ancestor of the Prince of Salerno by Louis XV. The front panel shows a battle scene, while the back is decorated with flowers, possibly by Jean-Louis Morin. The battle scene shows two armies, one side in white coats and the other in blue. It probably refers to the last three years of the Seven Years' War that saw France allied with Austria and Spain against Britain and Prussia.

Waddesdon's second ship vase has a dark blue ground colour with caillouté decoration, trellis-work and scrolls in gold. The two panels were probably painted by André-Vincent Vielliard. The front panel shows peasants seated around a table outside a tavern. This scene was adapted from a detail of the painting Fête de Village by David Teniers the Younger. Baron Ferdinand purchased this vase from the collection of the 5th Earl Spencer.

The ground colour of the third ship vase is a rare 'petit vert' which was only produced for a short time around 1760. It is believed to have been purchased from a 'Mrs Yorke of Torquay'. The dock-side scene was possibly painted by Jean-Louis Morin, while the back panel is decorated with flowers. The architectural base of this vase is unique and differs from all other known ship vases. The vase was probably designed to be mounted on its existing ormolu plinth in which an ormolu dolphin is interposed between each pair of triglyphs.

All three vases were produced around 1761 and are now owned by the National Trust.

=== Louvre, Paris ===
Jean-Claude Duplessis (c. 1695–1774), painted by Charles-Nicolas Dodin (1734–1803), c. 1760 in pink and green, with a chinoiserie scene in the main panel, after a painting by François Boucher. Once in the bedchamber of Madame de Pompadour at the Hôtel d'Évreux, which is today the Elysée Palace. Soft-paste porcelain, H. 37 cm; W. 35 cm.

=== Walters Art Museum, Baltimore ===
H: 15 5/16 in. (38.9 cm), 1764. Dark-blue main colour, with sailors packing fish in front main panel, and a maritime trophy on the rear. Provenance: Henry Walters, Baltimore, 1928, by purchase; Walters Art Museum, 1931, by bequest. The feet are later, in gilt-wood. This differs from most examples in the form of the openwork in the upper part, here with long vertical slits rather than the complicated pattern with units of a tear shape and crescent below on most examples.

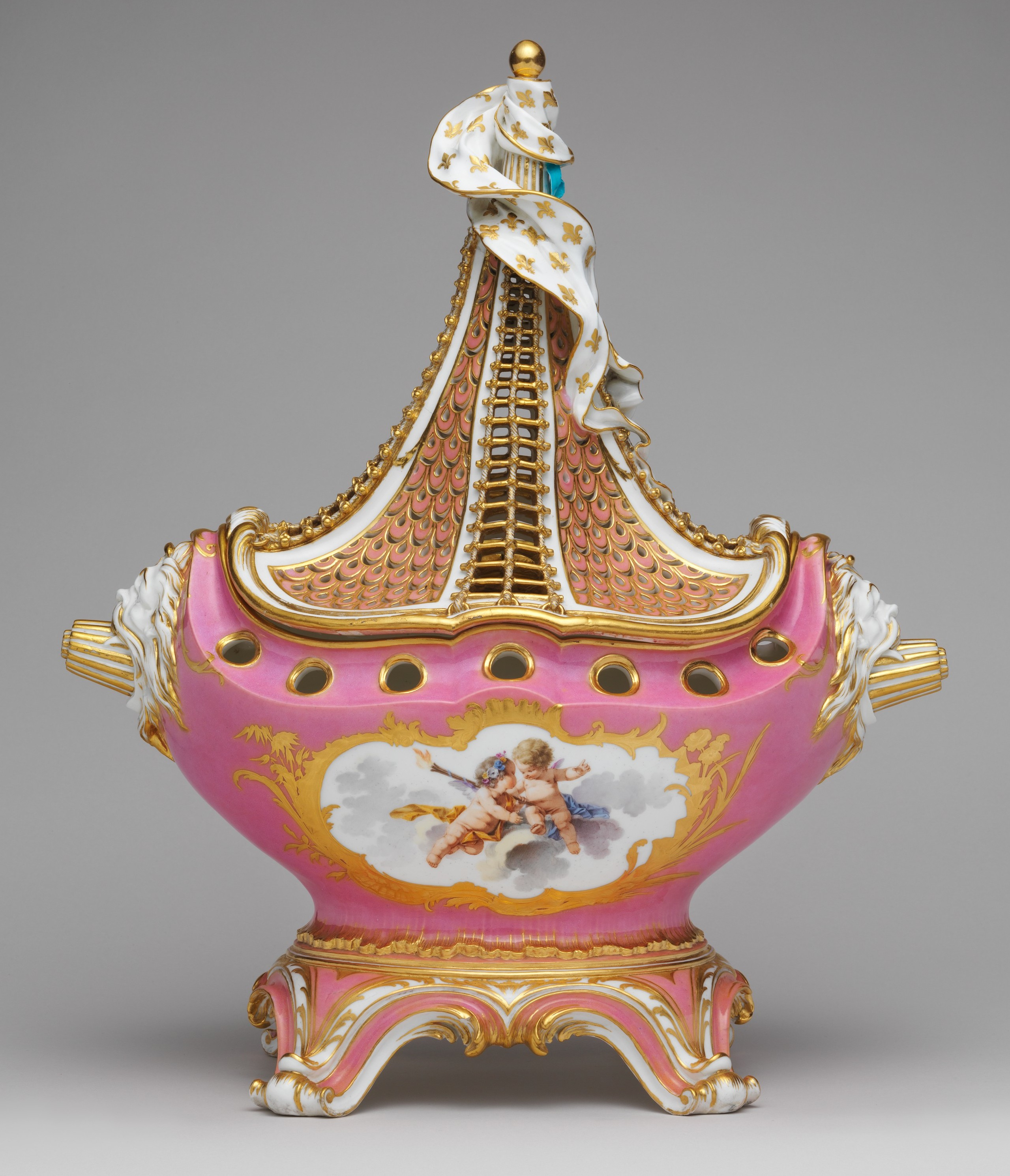
Metropolitan Museum of Art, c. 1757–58

=== Metropolitan Museum of Art, New York ===
Main colour pink, painted with cherubs in the main panel. Designed by Jean-Claude Duplessis (active 1748–74) and dated about 1757–58, this is in soft-paste porcelain, with Sèvres pink the main colour. With an overall dimension of 44.8 × 37.5 cm it was gifted by the Samuel H. Kress Foundation in 1958, and is believed to be the vase in the ownership of Louis-Joseph, Prince of Condé (where it formed a garniture with two of the famous elephant-head vases) and passed down after the French Revolution to Sir Charles Mills, 2nd Baronet, later Baron Hillingdon in 1888 and by descent in his family. Notable marks include crossed Ls, and E. below, in blue on the underside with the factory mark and year letter.

=== Royal Collection, UK ===
"Soft-paste porcelain, bleu lapis and green ground overlaid with gilded œil-de-perdrix decoration, further gilding and gilt bronze", with interlaced LLs enclosing the date-letter F, c. 1758/9. Dimensions, excluding stand, 45.2 × 37.8 × 19.3 cm. In 2017 it was in the Green Drawing Room of Buckingham Palace.

Acquired by George IV, the vase in the Royal Collection is the largest of the three models of this shape produced at Sèvres, and is decorated with two ground colours, green and dark blue. The front reserve depicts a genre scene taken from an unknown source, inspired by David Teniers the Younger (1610–90). The ends of the vase are in the form of a bowsprit, projecting from the jaws of a marine head, and at the masthead is a fluttering white pennant, patterned with fleurs-de-lis. The vase was purchased in 1759 at the end-of-year sale at Versailles by Madame de Pompadour for 960 livres. Madame de Pompadour is known to have owned at least three examples of this model (including those now in the Louvre and Royal Collection); these formed important components of her sumptuously appointed apartments.

=== Wallace Collection, London ===
Acquired by Richard Seymour-Conway, 4th Marquess of Hertford, by 1865, and possibly from the collection of Marie-Gabriel-Florens-Auguste, comte de Choiseul, known as Choiseul-Gouffier, this is the third of the ship-shaped vases designed by Jean-Claude Duplessis père (active 1748–74) in the 1750s. The naval theme is emphasised by the faceted bowsprits in the mouths of the marine masks and is a reminder that at this time the French navy was involved in the Seven Years' War (1756–63). The Wallace Collection example dates from 1761, composed of soft-paste porcelain, is painted and gilded, and is 44.1 × 36.9 cm.

=== Frick Collection, New York ===
Green and blue colours, birds in trees in the main panel. Sèvres Manufactory vaisseau à mat pot-pourri vase in the shape of a masted ship (one of a set of three), ca. 1759. Porcelain, soft paste. 17-1/2 in. × 14-7/8 in. × 7-1/2 in. Purchased by the Frick Collection in 1916.

=== Getty Museum, Los Angeles ===
Genre scene on the front with flower garland on rear. Painting attributed to Charles-Nicolas Dodin, porcelain painter, about 1760. Soft paste porcelain, pink and green ground colors, polychrome enamel decoration and gilding. H: 1 ft. 2 3/4 in. × W: 1 ft. 1 11/16 in. × D: 6 13/16 in.
