= Jean-Louis Morin (porcelain painter) =

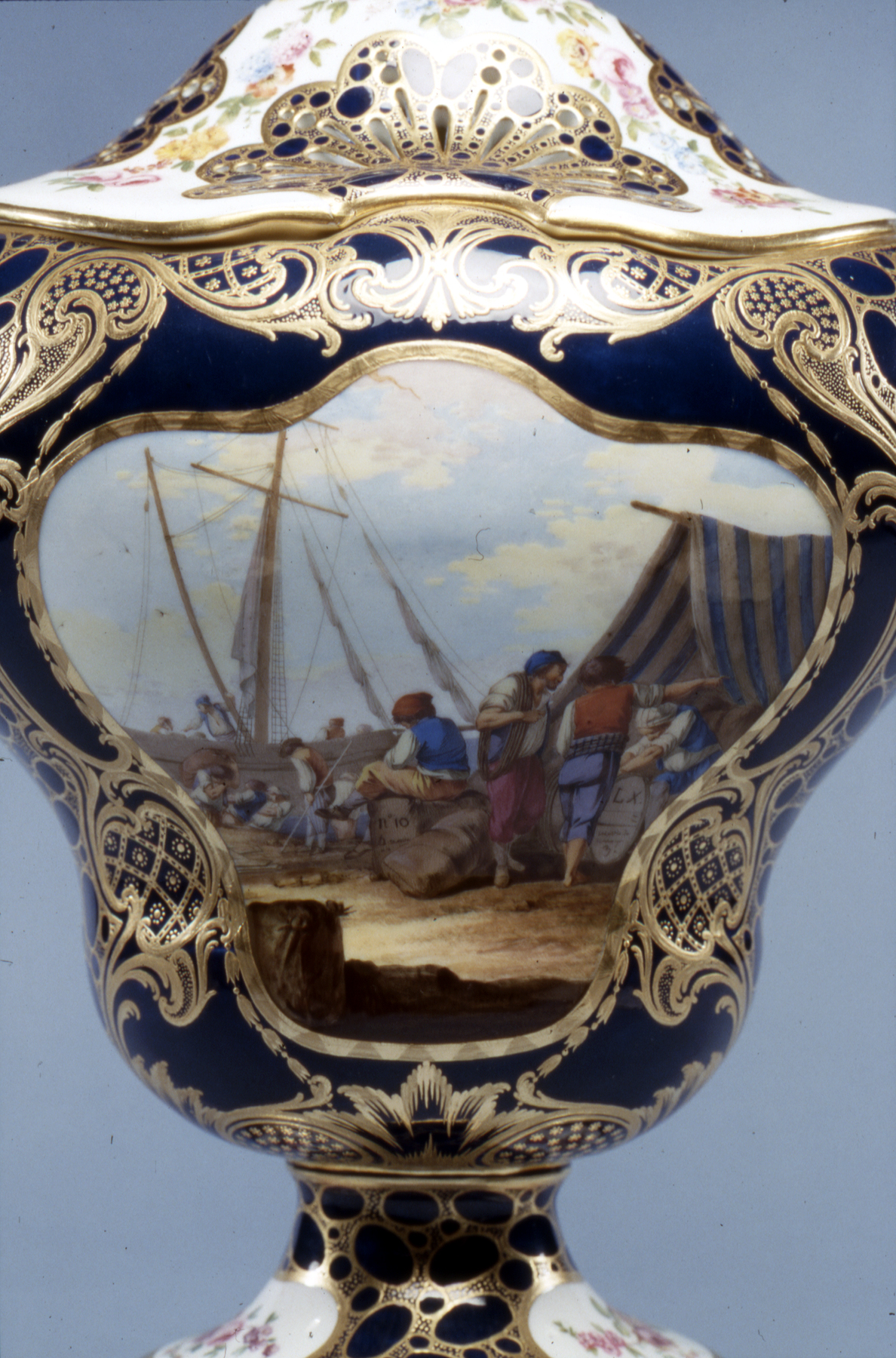
Sèvres porcelain potpourri vase with a harbor scene painted by Jean-Louis Morin.

Jean-Louis Morin (1732-1787) was a French porcelain painter who worked at the Sèvres Porcelain Manufactory from 1754 to 1787. He was a specialist in figure painting known for his depictions of military and marine scenes which he painted on useful wares, as well as ornamental and flower vases. Unusually he used his own sketches for the design of the paintings. His artist's signature featured a scrolling upper or lower cased letter M.

Morin was born in Vincennes, France, the son of an army surgeon, and initially studied surgery before enrolling at the Vincennes manufactory (Manufacture nationale de Sèvres) at age 21. He was described at the time as being '""five foot four inches high, with red hair, shifty eyes and nearly white [skin]...and freckles, wearing a wig, with an ugly body.'" Although he had some ability in drawing he "had little talent for the more difficult task of applying colors". His early endeavors at the factory saw him painting cherubs into clouds and landscapes, on vases and tea wares, working alongside Dodin, one of the factory’s leading figure-painters. After a few years of practice Morin's work and skill had improved, and his use of colour was also making progress. By 1758 Morin began to work on coloured reserves, painting "realistic and picturesque scenes from the life of dockers and soldiers".

Morin worked at the factory until his death in 1787 at the age of 55.
