= Vincennes porcelain =

The Vincennes porcelain manufactory was established in 1740 in the disused royal Château de Vincennes, in Vincennes, east of Paris, which was from the start the main market for its wares.

== History ==
The entrepreneur in charge at first, Claude-Humbert Gérin, established workshops and employed craftsmen from the Chantilly manufactory, whose patron, the duc de Bourbon, had recently died. Notable defectors from Chantilly were the debt-ridden brothers Gilles and Robert Dubois, one a sculptor, the other a painter. When early trial pieces were shown to the marquis du Châtelet, he arranged with Orry de Fulvy, brother of a superintendent of royal buildings, that a factory be set up in the premises of the disused royal château to manufacture a brilliantly white soft-paste porcelain.

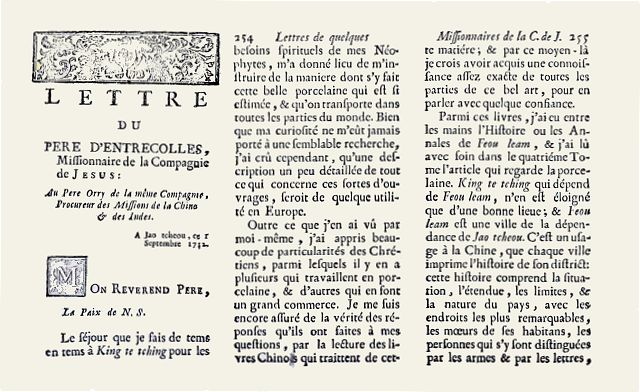
Section of a letter from Francois Xavier d'Entrecolles about Chinese porcelain manufacturing techniques, 1712, re-published by Jean-Baptiste du Halde in 1735.

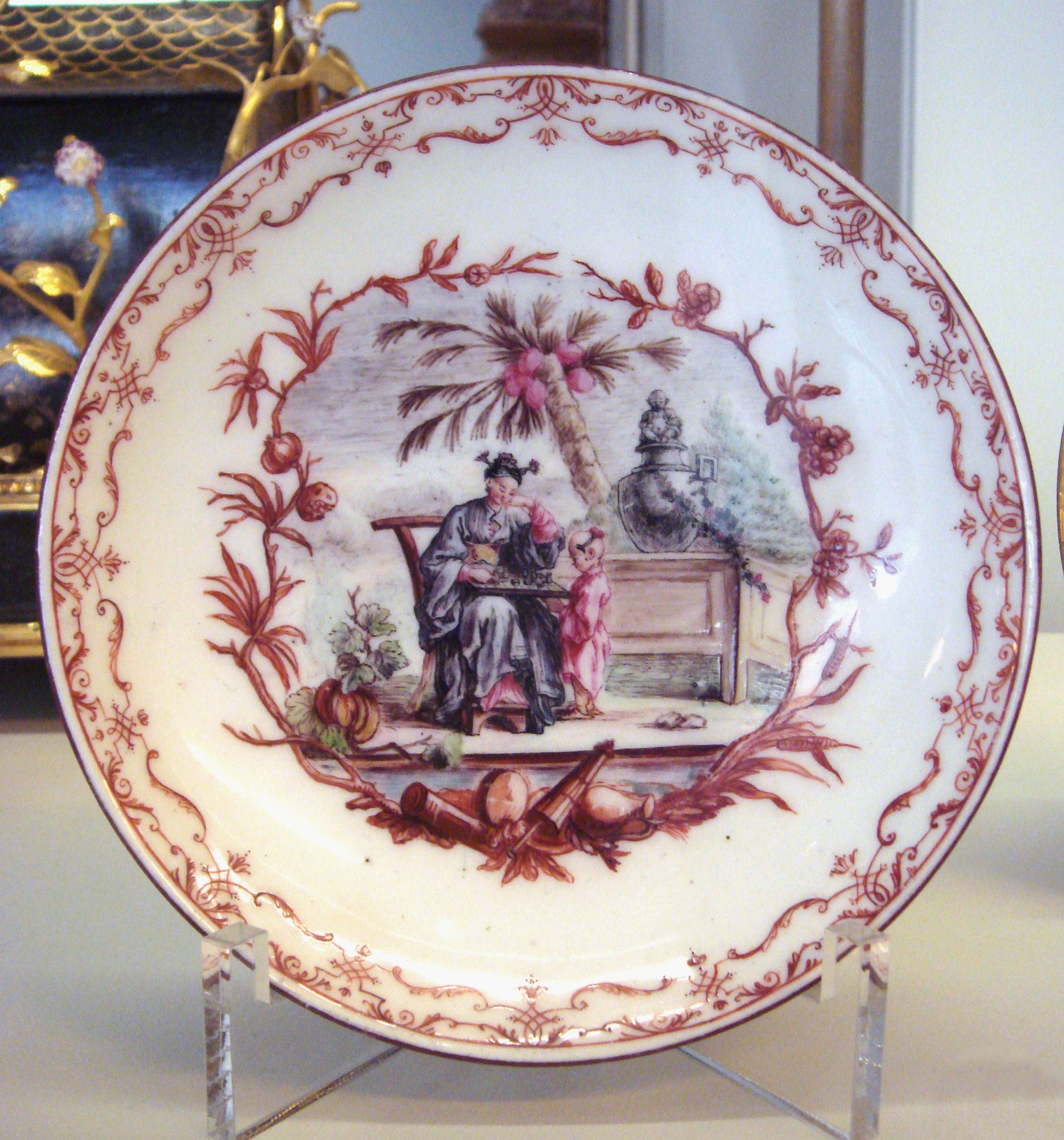
Vincennes soft porcelain plate, 1749–1753

The Chinese manufacturing secrets for porcelain manufacturing were revealed by the Jesuit Father Francois Xavier d'Entrecolles in 1712, and openly published in 1735. One ingredient for porcelain was kaolin; the porcelain manufactory of Meissen, near Dresden, was taking advantage of the first kaolin deposits identified in Europe, but hard-paste porcelain in France had to wait for the first French kaolin, discovered near Limoges later in the eighteenth century.

Early experiments produced so many imperfect pieces spoiled in the kiln, that debts mounted, in spite of aristocratic encouragement, and the partners, on the verge of bankruptcy, slipped away, leaving the kilns, workmen and the still-born production in the hands of a subordinate, Louis-François Gravant (died 1765). The continued patronage by Orry de Fulvy achieved the first successes on the Paris market about 1745, and further essential capitalization was raised through a consortium of twenty-one progressive-minded tax farmers. The first direct royal support came in the form of a privilege for manufacturing porcelain after the manner of Saxon Meissen porcelain, signed by Louis XV, 24 July 1745, in favour of Charles Adam, one of the silent partners. The silversmith Jean-Claude Duplessis was brought in during 1745; he designed vases for Vincennes embodying the robust yet balanced French Rococo.

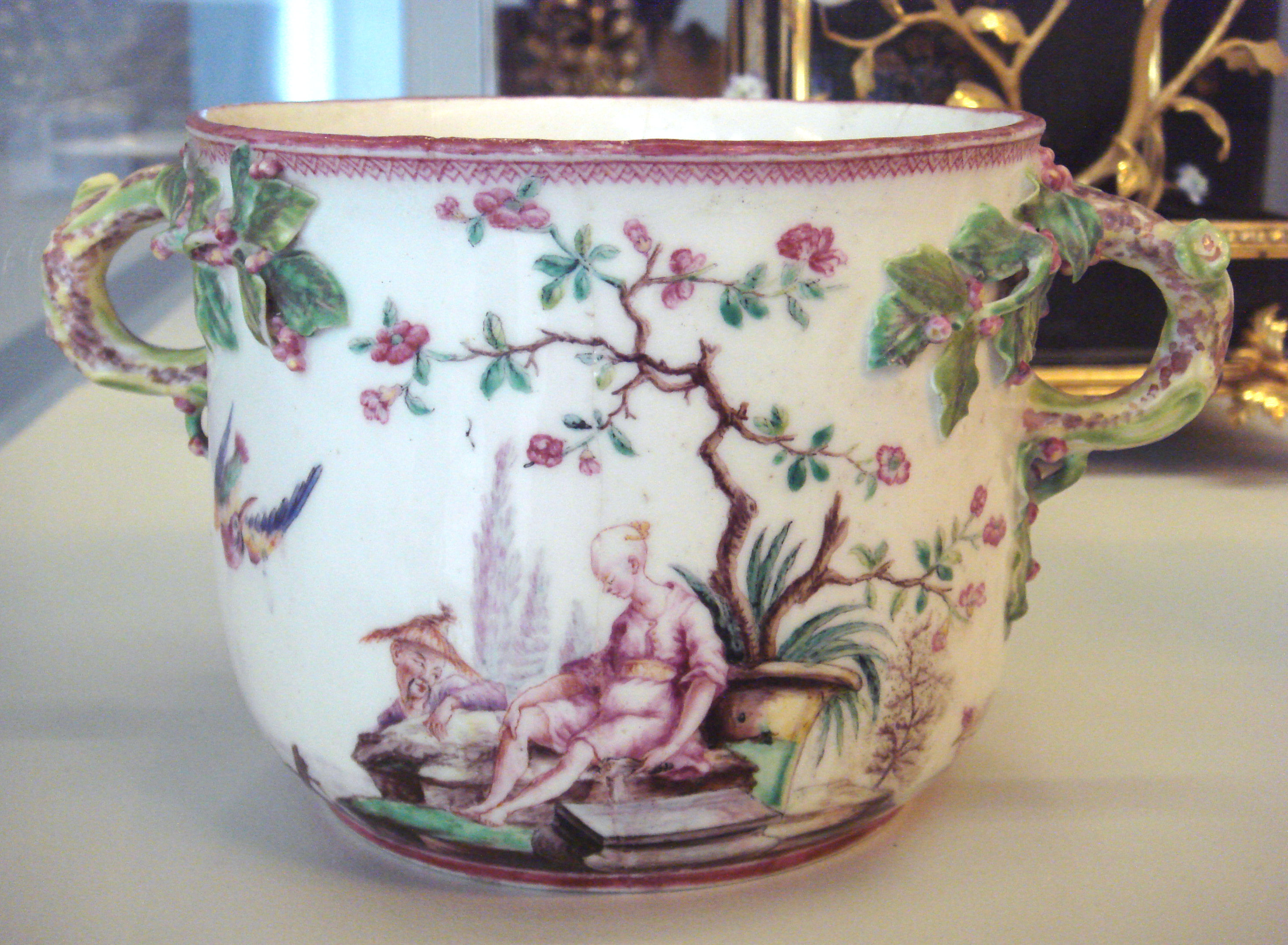
Vincennes soft porcelain seau, 1749–1753

Aside from tea wares and dinner services, and decorative vases, often in imitation of Meissen porcelain—"in the style of Saxony, painted and gilded and depicting human figures" the warrant granted by Louis XV ran—the Vincennes manufactory specialized in making naturalistic flowers, which were incorporated into bouquets or in flower sprays added to cut-glass-hung gilt-bronze chandeliers under the direction of Parisian marchands-merciers, who alone were permitted to combine the production of so many separate craft guilds. Gifted sculptors were contracted to provide models for table sculptures, and a white, unglazed, matte biscuit porcelain ware imitating white marble was introduced in 1751.

New glaze colors were developed at Vincennes, bleu céleste, a rich sky blue, bleu turquoise, the "Turkish" blue that fixed that color name in European languages, and the dark bleu lapis which might be overlaid with traces of gilded veining that disguised variations in the glaze. Enamel painting was applied over the fired glazes, to be refired at lower temperature, and at Vincennes the refinement of its techniques began to approach that of miniatures. The Vincennes workshops perfected the art of gilding applied over the already-fired glazes then re-fired at a still lower temperature, to offer luxury wares of a sophistication never before seen in France.

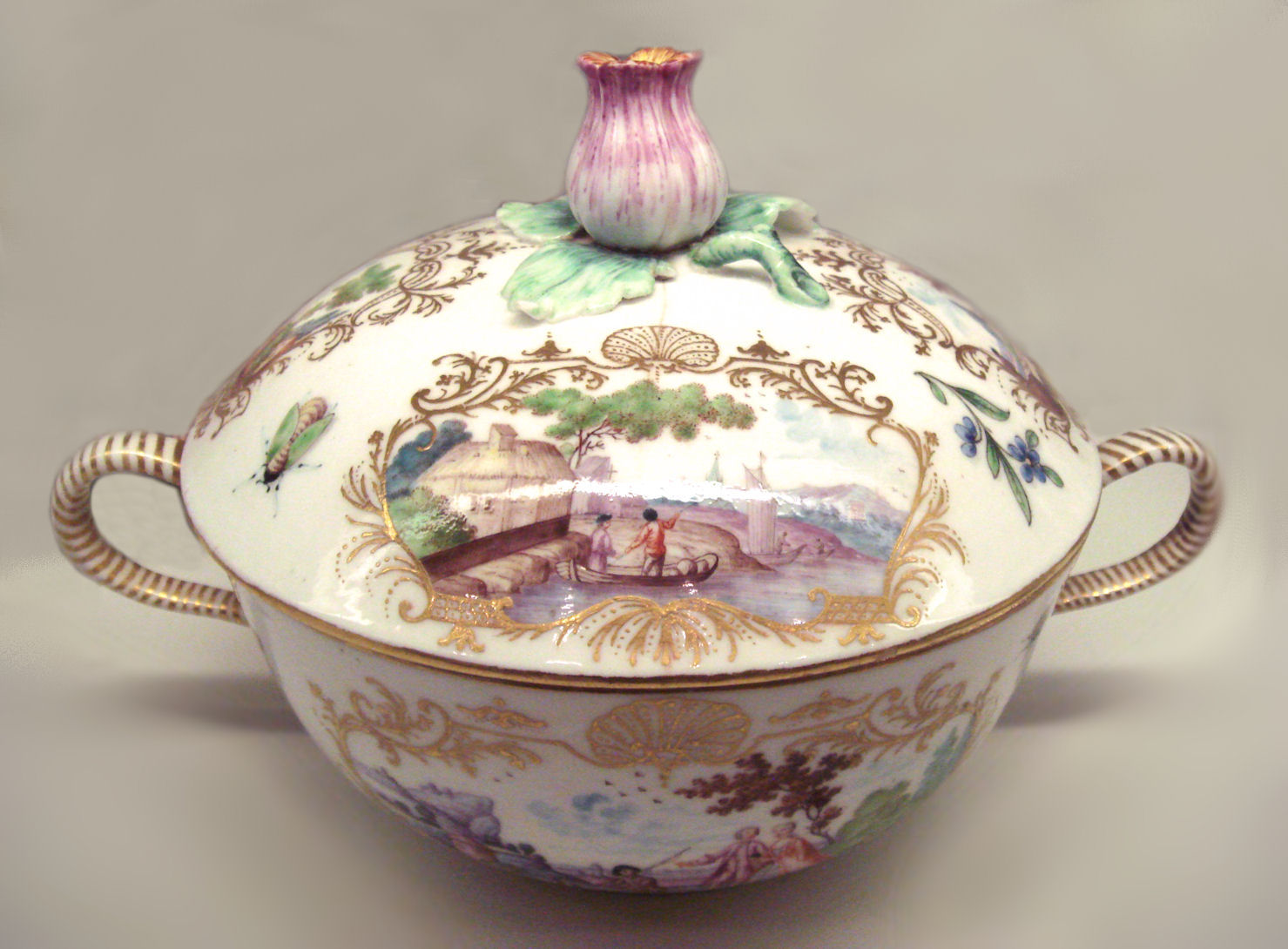
Vincennes soft-porcelain, 1749–1750

In April 1748, the presentation to the Queen Marie Leszczyńska of a vase of porcelain flowers, fully three feet tall, offered a dramatic public demonstration at Court of the manufactory's capabilities, and incidentally reveals the intervention of the Parisian marchand-mercier, who alone could commission the gilt bronze mount in which the vase had been set. The duc de Luynes described the gift:

"M. de Fulvy, who continues to be the director of the porcelain manufactory at Vincennes, had a porcelain vase brought to the Queen, which he presented to her on behalf of the company. Three small white figures, together with a porcelain vase, were mounted on a gilt-bronze pedestal. The vase contains a bouquet of flowers also made in porcelain. M. de Fulvy told me there were 480 flowers in the bouquet. The vase with its pedestal and the flowers stood about three feet high. The bronze mounting alone cost 100 louis, and the porcelain just as much; it is a perfect work of its kind—as much for the whiteness as for the execution of the small figures and the flowers. This manufactory is now superior to that of Saxony for the making of flowers"

The young Dauphine Maria Josepha ordered a similar vase to be sent to her father, Frederick Augustus II, Elector of Saxony, the patron of the "Saxon porcelain" made at Meissen.

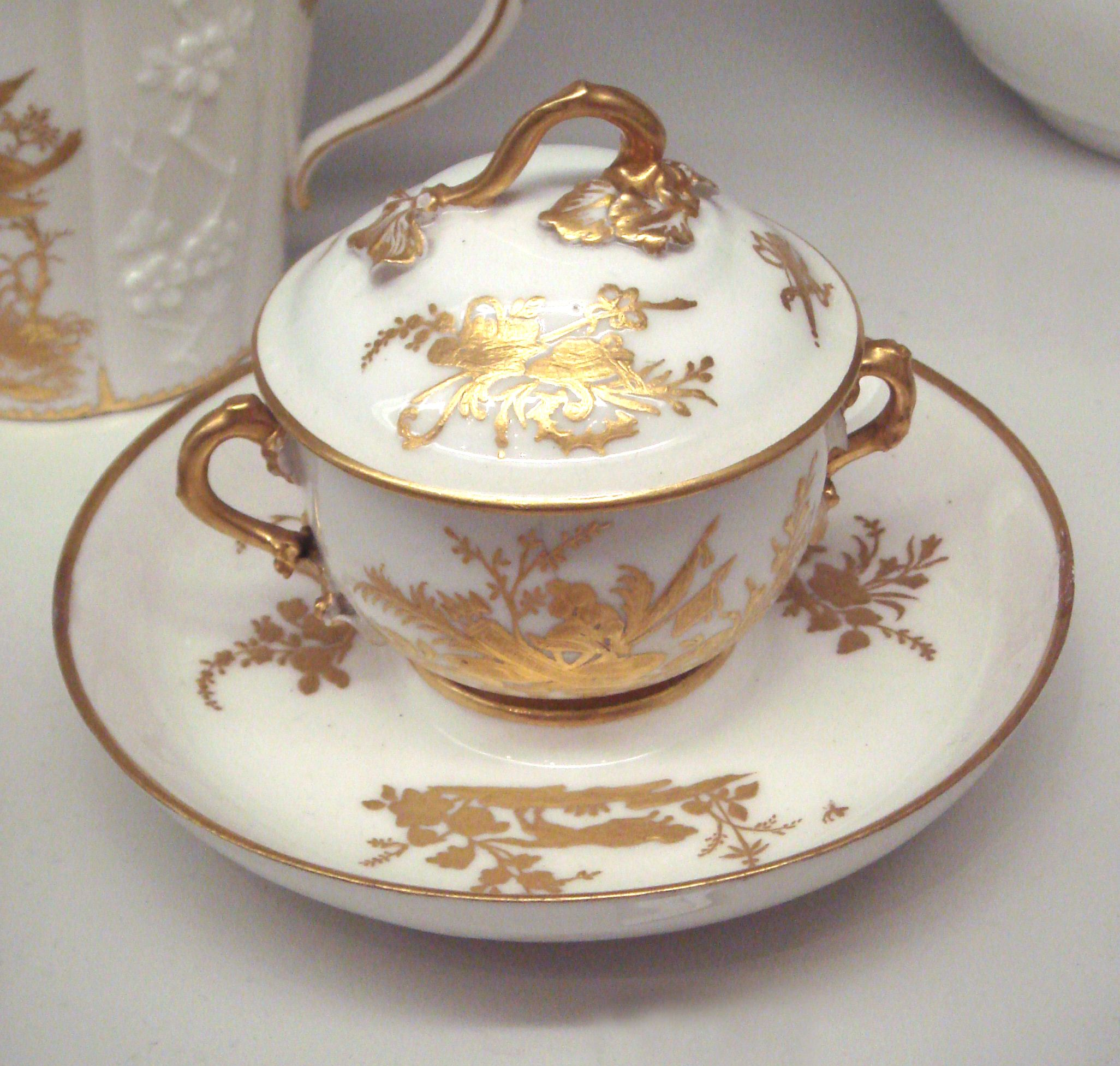
Vincennes soft porcelain cup, 1750–1752

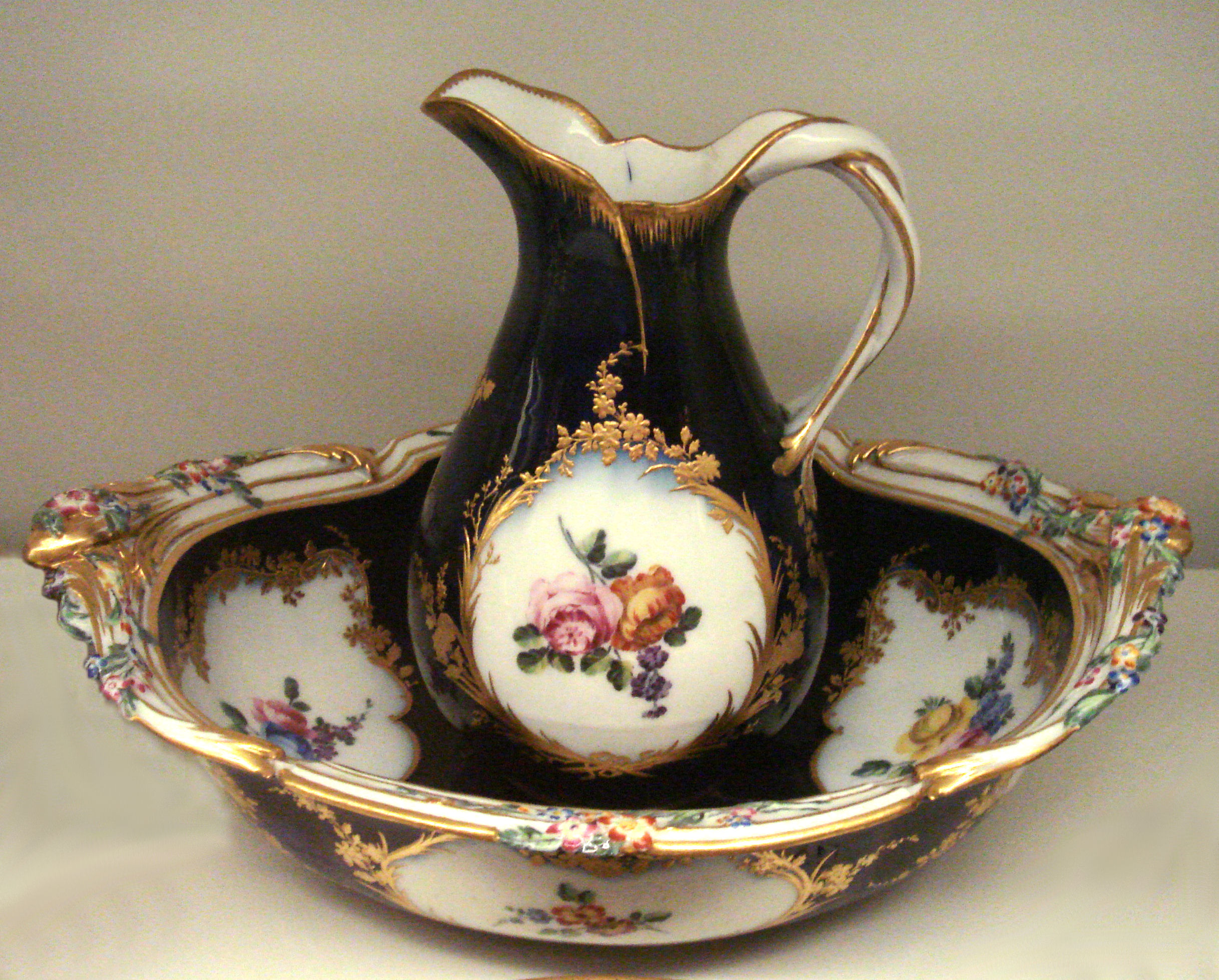
Vincennes soft-porcelain vase, 1753

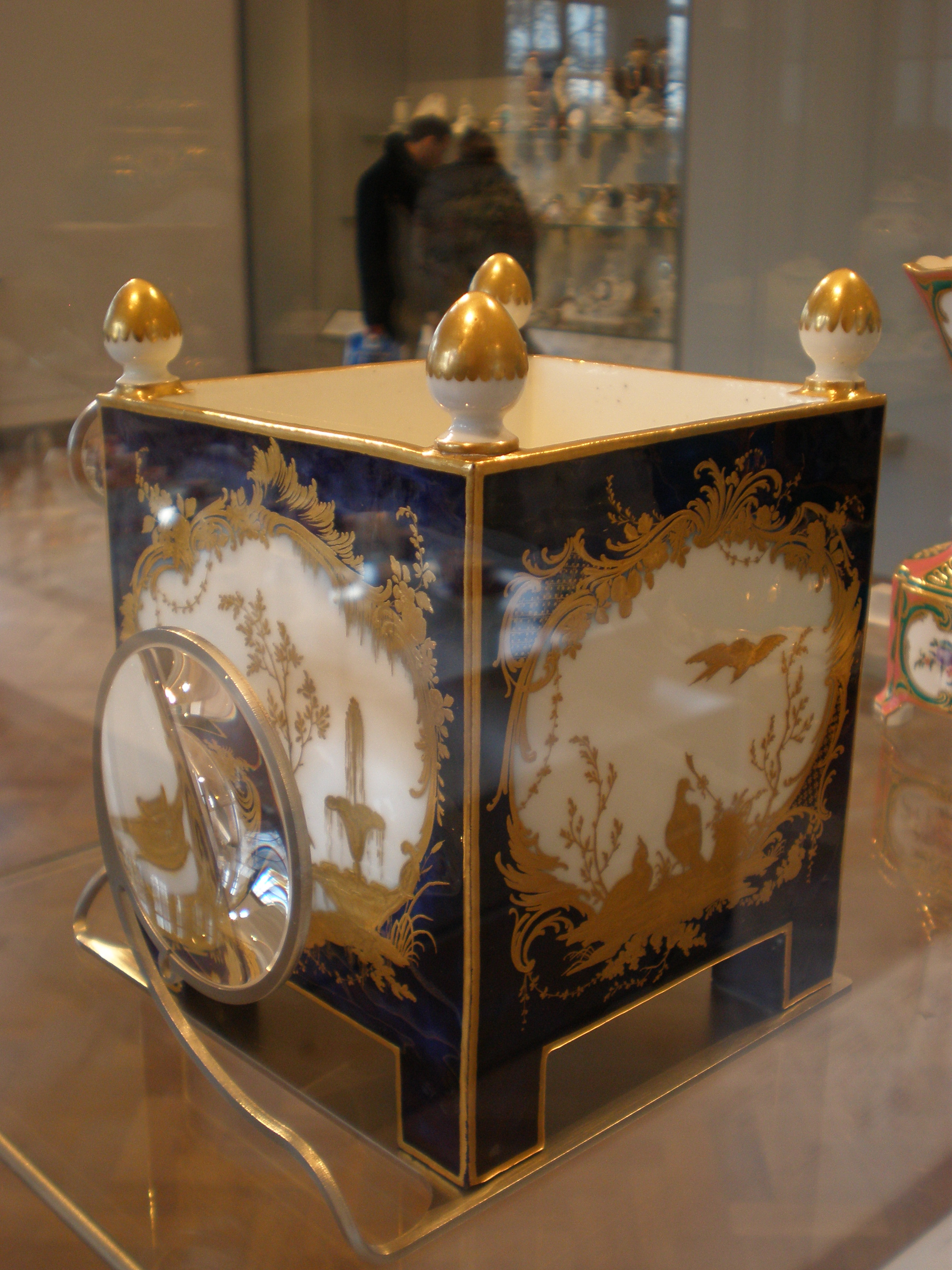
Vincennes plant pot, c. 1753

The unexpected deaths in 1750 and 1751 of both brothers Fulvy created a financial impasse that was resolved when the King stepped in and made of Vincennes the object of royal patronage, though less than a manufacture royale; it continued under the personal patronage of Madame de Pompadour. The covered vases of the model pot-pourri Pompadour were designed by Duplessis and made from 1752. The painter Jean-Jacques Bachelier directed the enamelling workshop from 1751, and the chemist Jean Hellot, author of several works on metallurgy and an Académicien, was put in charge of chemical operations, conducting systematic investigations of clays, glazes and enamel colours.

After 1752, through a Royal Edict, Vincennes was handed a monopoly of polychrome decors, which reduced the scope of other manufactories to some degree.

== Transfer to Sèvres (1756) ==
In 1756 the Vincennes porcelain factory shifted to new premises at Sèvres, west of Paris, until 1759, when, with the enterprise threatening to go bankrupt, the King bought it outright, initiating the career of world-famous Sèvres porcelain, which was a direct outgrowth of Vincennes. In 1757 Étienne Maurice Falconet was appointed director of the sculpture atelier, when Vincennes officially became a manufacture royale de porcelaine. The procedure of introducing datemarks, and painters' and gilders' marks, which has made a detailed understanding of individual styles of Sèvres possible, was initiated at Vincennes, in 1753.

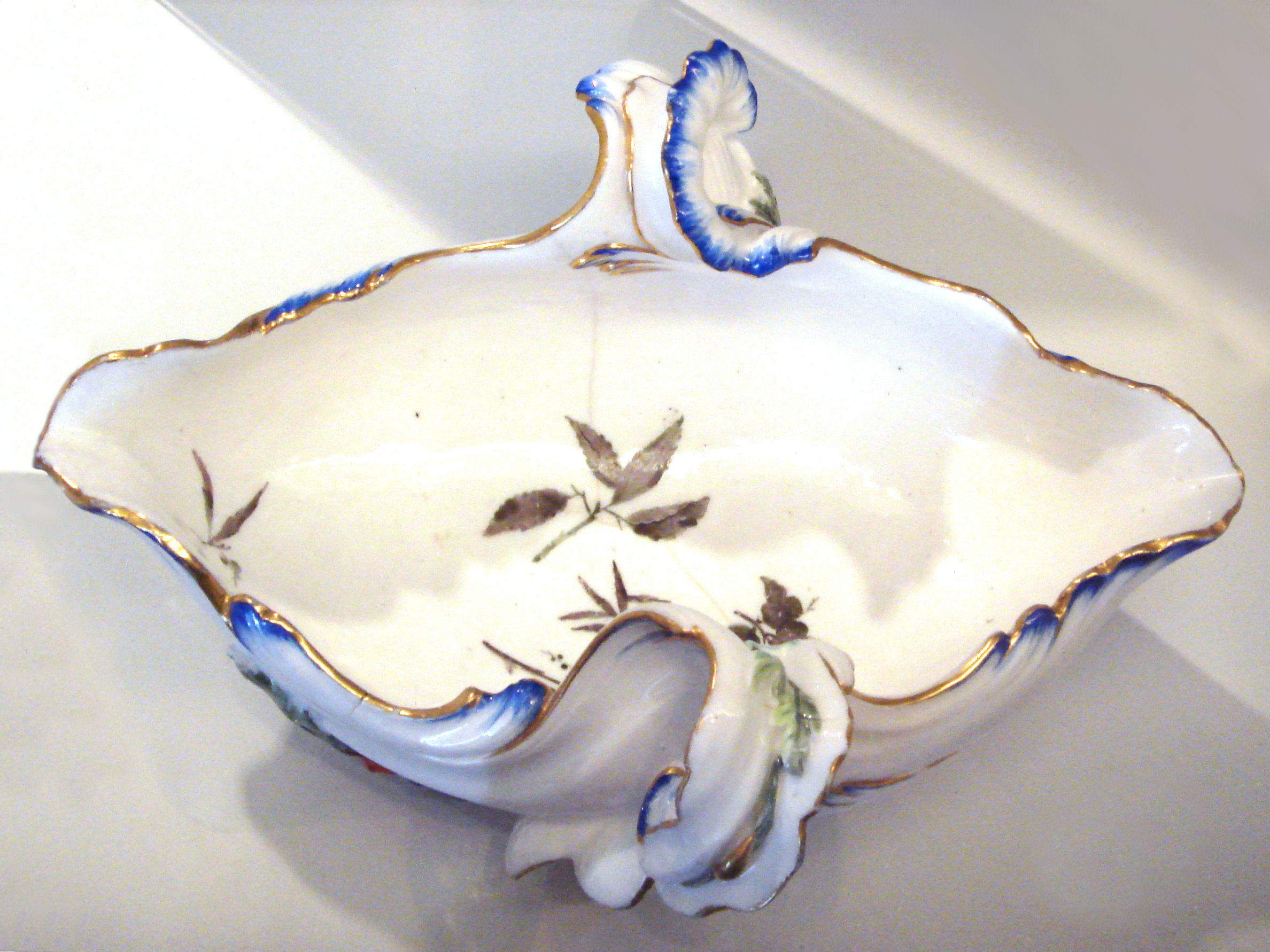
Sauceboat by Jean-Claude Chambellan Duplessis, Vincennes, 1756

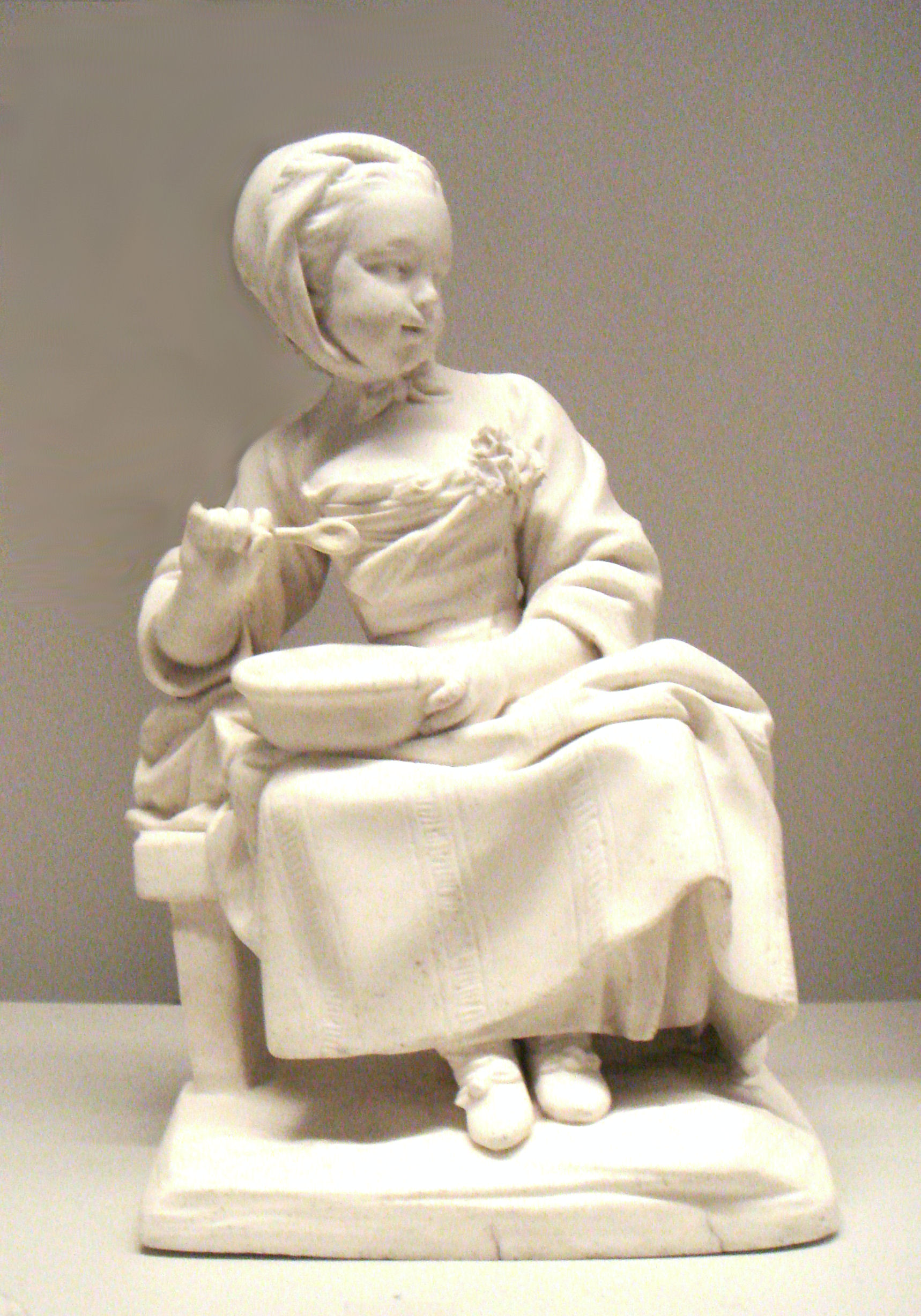
Soft-paste bisque porcelain from Vincennes 1754–1755

Porcelain flowers continued to provide the bulk of Vincennes sales: Mme de Pompadour, whose Château de Bellevue was not far from the new site, made lavish purchases of them to decorate her rooms and d'Argenson's anecdote of her receiving Louis XV there in a conservatory furnished in winter with perfumed porcelain flowers among those from the hothouse, is a familiar one; the inventory after her death showed that she owned 46 decorative items decorated with porcelain flowers.

== See also ==
- Orientalism in early modern France
