= Jean-Claude Chambellan Duplessis =

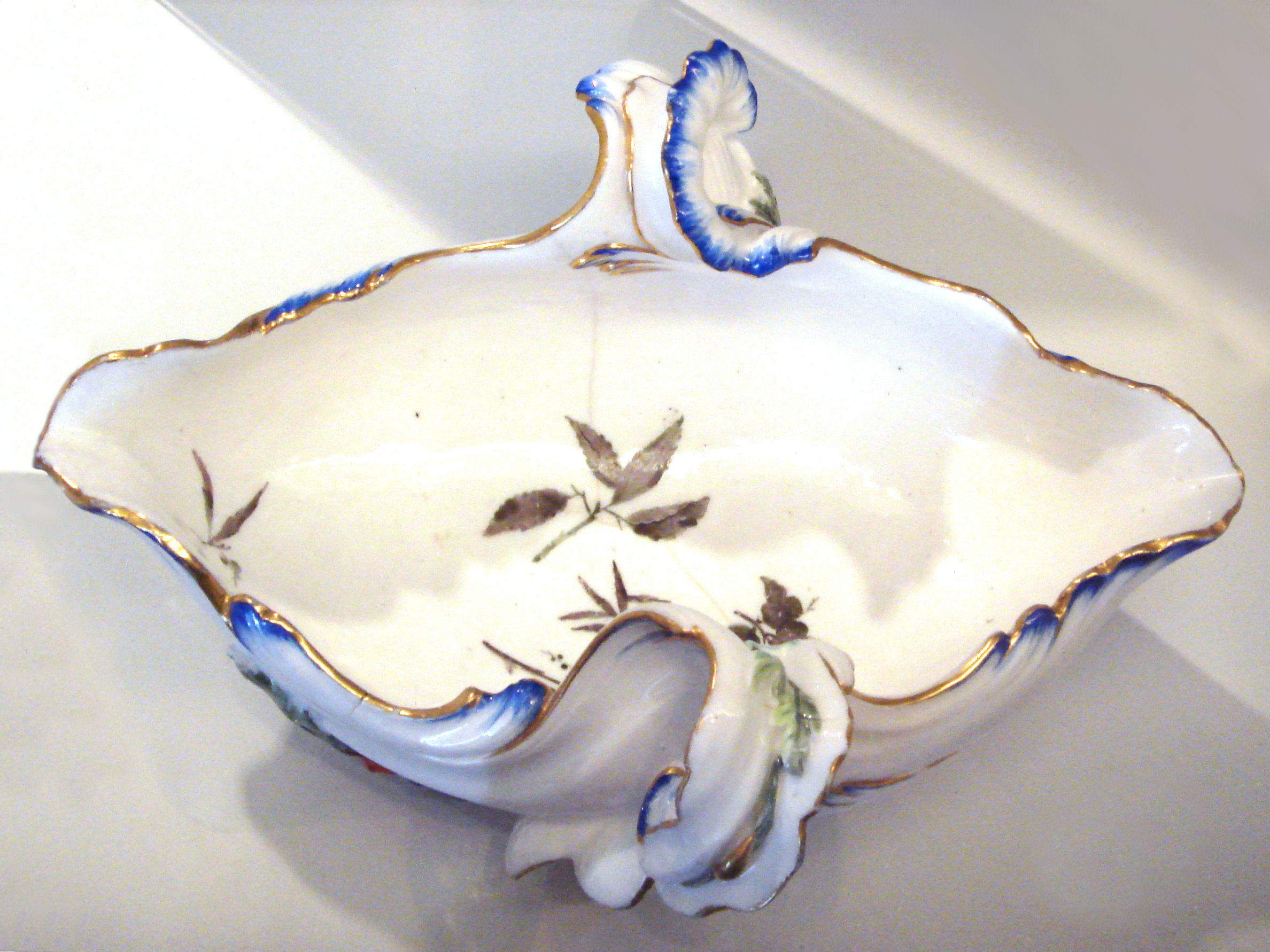
Vincennes porcelain sauceboat by Jean-Claude Chambellan Duplessis, Vincennes, 1756.

Jean-Claude Chambellan Duplessis (1699 — 1774), called Duplessis père to distinguish him from his son, Jean-Claude-Thomas Chambellan Duplessis (c. 1730 — 1783), was a goldsmith, sculptor and ceramics modeller, bronze-founder and decorative designer working in the Rococo manner. He served as artistic director of the Vincennes porcelain manufactory and its successor at Sèvres from 1748 to his death in 1774 and as royal goldsmith (orfèvre du Roi) from 1758 to 1774.

He was born in Turin, as Giovanni Claudio Ciambellano. His earliest work in Turin was carried out for the Prince de Carignan and other members of the house of Savoy. He arrived in Paris in the suite of Victor Amadeus I, Prince of Carignan who ran away to Paris in 1718 and set up an extravagant establishment at the Hôtel de Soissons. When Carignan returned to Turin, Duplessis placed himself under the protection of Marc-René de Voyer de Paulmy d'Argenson (1722–1787), who obtained for him workshop lodgings in the galeries du Louvre as a privileged worker not bound by the rules of the Paris guilds, which would not have accepted a foreign-born craftsman.

== Porcelain ==
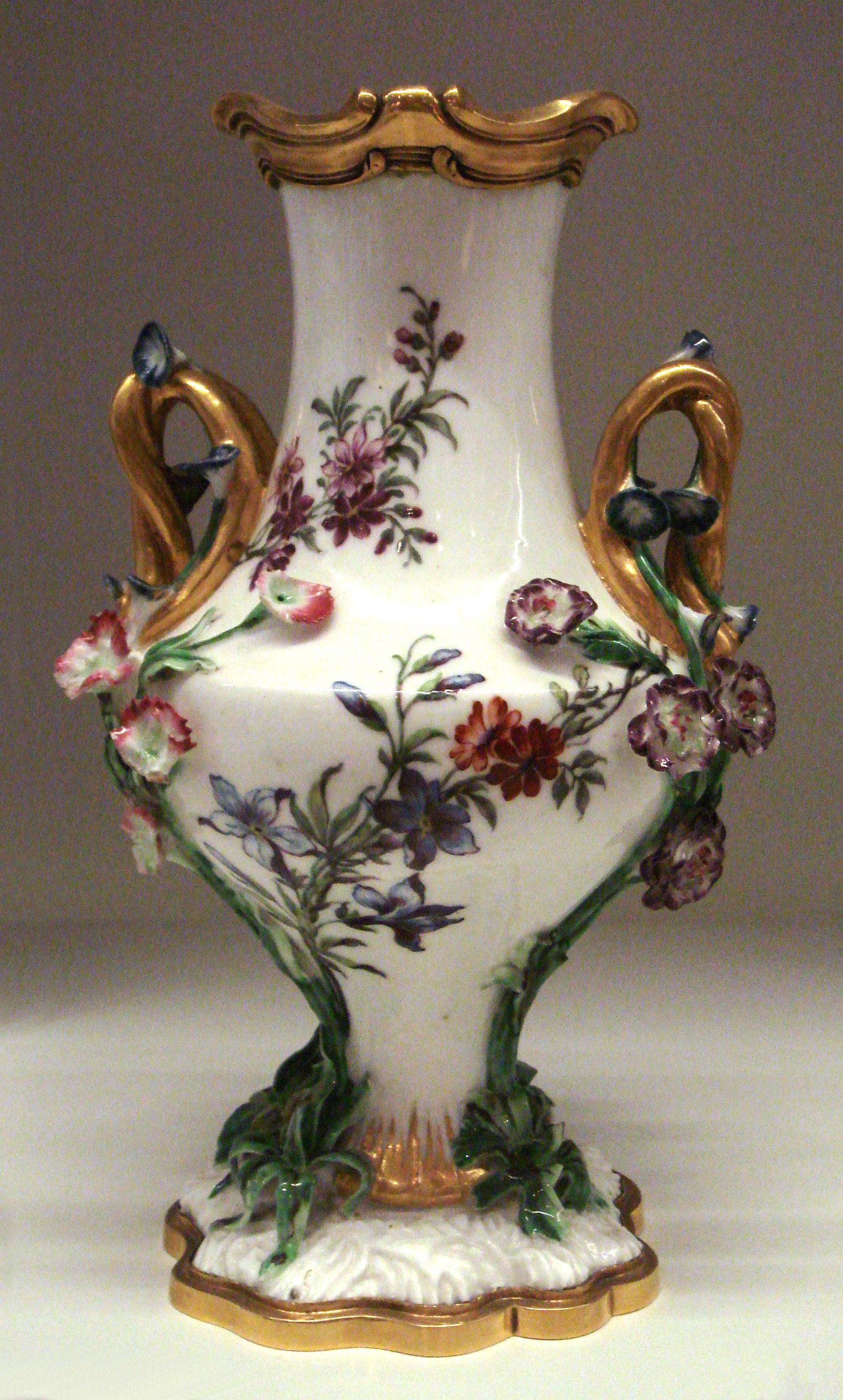
Vase Duplessis, Vincennes porcelain, marked for 1753, with gilt-bronze lip and base.

In 1748, Duplessis joined the porcelain manufactory at Vincennes, where he worked four days a week, modeling new designs for vessels and vases that gave the production at Vincennes new life. The extravagant everted forms of several versions of the Vase Duplessis demonstrate his style. In 1755 he perfected an offset lathe that could turn oval forms.

In August 1756 he moved with the Vincennes manufactory to its new quarters that became the Manufacture nationale de Sèvres. Made Orfèvre du Roi (goldsmith to the king) in 1758, he occupied lodgings in rue Sainte-Marthe in 1764.

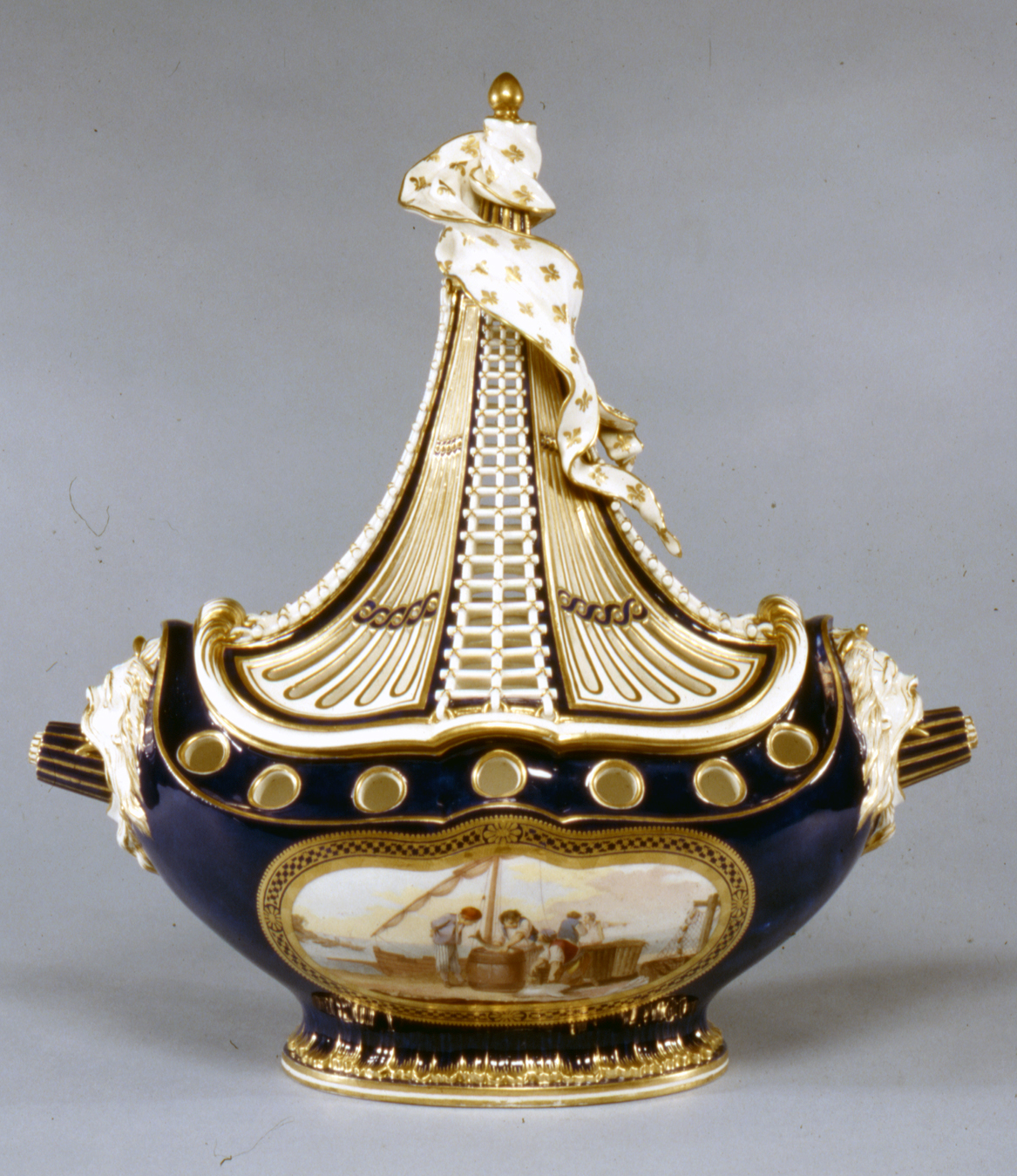
Sèvres pot-pourri vase in the shape of a ship

Duplessis invented the extravagant rococo forms of Vincennes and Sèvres vases, the ship-like Sèvres pot-pourri vase in the shape of a ship, or Vaisseau à mât, and the vase with elephant heads.

From the early 1760s his designs showed some first signs of the earliest neoclassicism, the goût grec.

== Gilt-bronze ==
Duplessis' designs in gilt-bronze are undocumented, aside from the pair of braziers made for presentation in 1742 to the ambassador from the Sublime Porte, Mehmed Said Efendi, of which one is conserved at Topkapi Palace Museum, Istanbul, and a set of mounts he contributed during the 1760s to the Bureau du Roi at Versailles. In Paris he created the wax models for gilt-bronze mounts for furniture and especially for porcelains, in which capacity he appears repeatedly in the day-book of the marchand-mercier Lazare Duvaux.

Among Duvaux's clients he collaborated most closely in work for the comte d'Argenson, Augustin Blondel de Gagny and the duc de Chaulnes. Extrapolating from Duplessis' vases for Vincennes and Sėvres, Ted Dell recognized Duplessis' hand in the bold Louis XV gilt-bronze mounts of a pair of dark blue Chinese porcelain vases in the Frick Collection (25.8.43-44) and tentatively suggested a core group of closely comparable gilt-bronze mounts for porcelains, ca 1755-60, that appear to be designed by the same hand. A robust gilt-bronze clock case at the Wallace Collection has also been attributed to Duplessis.
