= Dodin =

Dodin is a surname. Russian-language feminine form: Dodina. Notable people with the surname include:

- Evgenia Dodina
- Lev Dodin (born 1944), Russian theater director
- Océane Dodin, French tennis player
- Reema Dodin, American political advisor
- Sharry Dodin, Seychellois sprinter

== See also ==
- Dodin-Bouffant, fictional gourmet created by Marcel Rouff
