= Garniture =

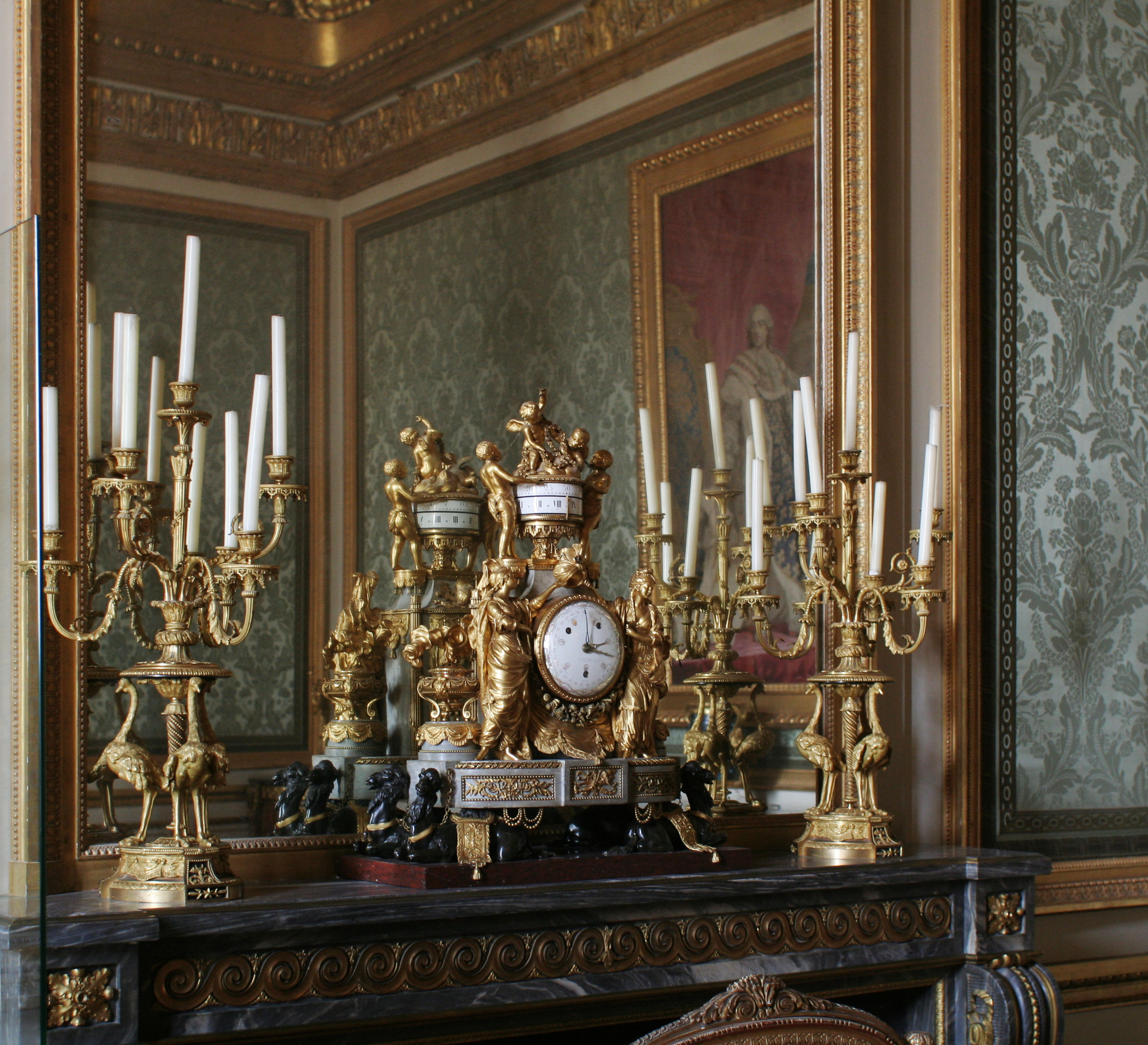
A garniture of an ormolu clock and candelabra

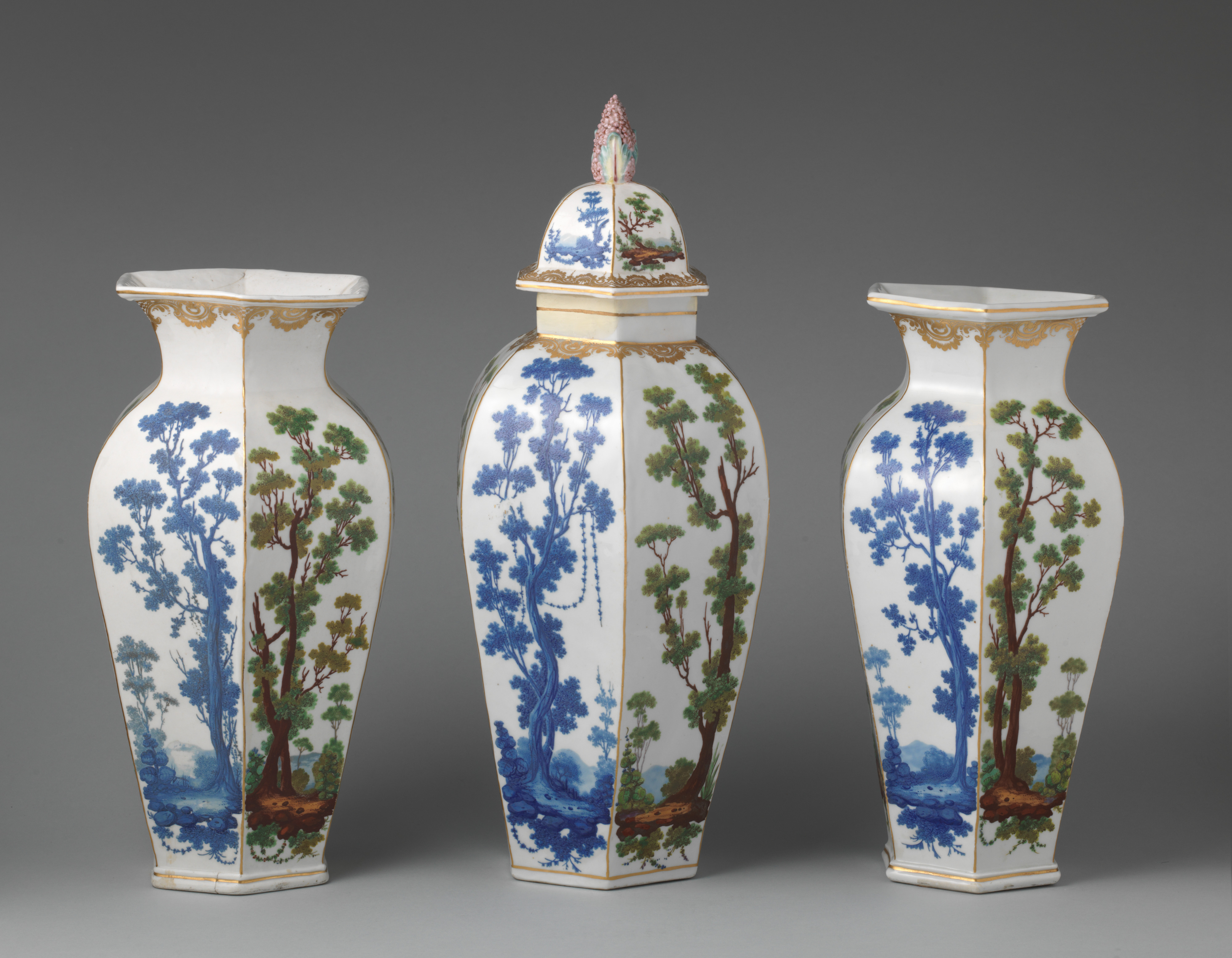
Garniture of three Bristol porcelain vases, c. 1773, painted by Michel Socquet.

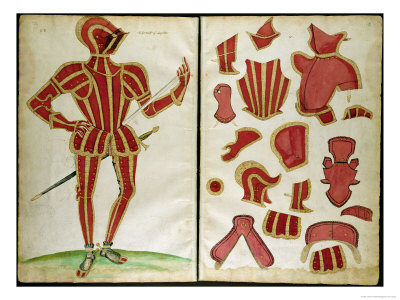
The garniture of Greenwich armour for Robert Dudley, Earl of Leicester, as recorded in their pattern book, the Jacob album

A garniture is a number or collection of any matching, but usually not identical, decorative objects intended to be displayed together. Frequently made of metal, ormolu, often with gilded wood stands, porcelain (both European and Asian), garnitures became popular during the latter half of the 17th century and remained in vogue throughout the 19th century. A very common placement is on the mantelpiece over a fireplace, but garnitures were very often placed on various pieces of furniture, and on ledges or niches around the walls of a room, especially over doors or above fireplaces. Garnitures may contain pieces made together with a view to being used as a set, or may be "assembled" by the decorator from pieces of different origin.

Most commonly a garniture is a collection of three matching pieces designed for the adornment of a mantlepiece; for example: a clock and two flanking vases or candelabra. Often a large central piece is flanked by pairs of smaller ones. Factory records show that some examples of the Sèvres pot-pourri vase in the shape of a ship were bought as garnitures with other smaller shapes decorated in the same colours (which varied greatly between individual examples). Madame de Pompadour bought one with two pairs of vases, and another buyer a garniture with one pair of the elephant-headed vases. A garniture can also refer to almost any set that might be displayed together. One example is a collection of figurines, candlesticks or epergnes designed to adorn a surtout de table.

Other uses of the word include a matching array of plate armour and its accessories, often with different types of the same pieces for different occasions, known as "pieces of exchange", sets of weapons with their fittings, and in French restaurant terminology, the "trimmings" or garnish around the main element of a dish. In French the range of meanings is even wider.

== Notable examples ==
- Khalili Imperial Garniture from late 19th century Japan
