= Royal manufactories in France =

Establishments benefiting from a royal charter

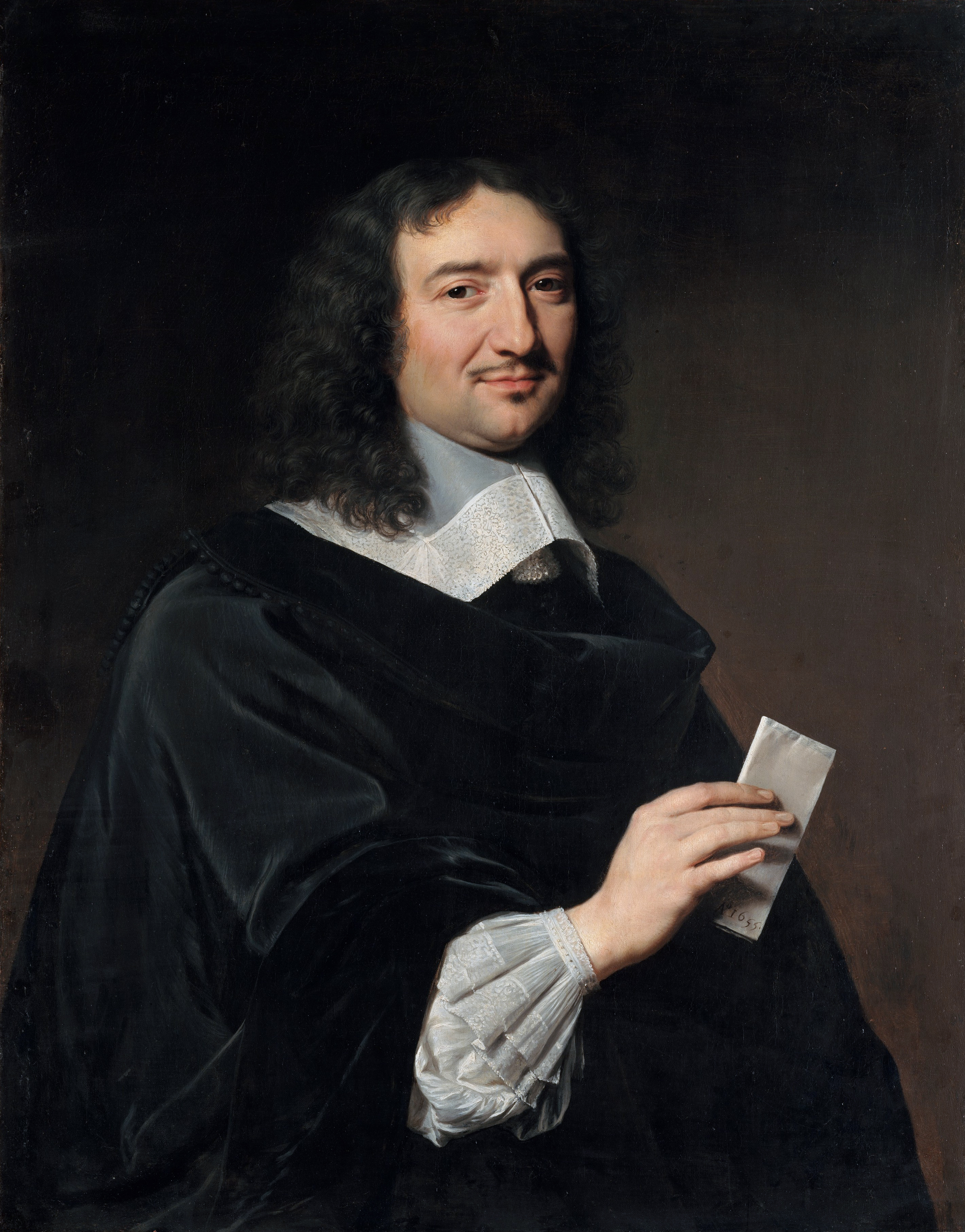
Jean-Baptiste Colbert, minister of Louis XIV between 1661 and 1683, and a major player in the industrialization of the Kingdom of France.

Royal manufactories in France during the 17th and 18th centuries were privileged establishments benefiting from a royal charter, meaning they operated under special regulations granted by letters patent. These privileges allowed them to bypass certain restrictions imposed on traditional trade guilds. For example, they were not subject to verification by guild inspectors, could employ more journeymen and apprentices than was typically allowed, could combine multiple trades under one roof, or even hold exclusive monopolies. These regulations, often comprising dozens of articles, replaced the traditional guild statutes and effectively created a separate legal framework for the manufactories.

These manufacturing centers often received state support through financial aid, technology transfers, public contracts, and protectionist measures such as temporary monopolies.

They are generally associated with the policies of Barthélemy de Laffemas, a minister under Henry IV, who in 1596 issued a General Regulation for Establishing Manufactories in This Kingdom, and of Jean-Baptiste Colbert, minister under Louis XIV from 1661 to 1683. Colbert implemented a state-driven industrial policy, founding manufactories in textiles, ironworking, ceramics, tobacco, shipbuilding, and glassmaking. The most famous was the Manufacture des Glaces de Miroirs, which supplied mirrors for the Hall of Mirrors in the Palace of Versailles.

During the 17th century, the number of manufactories continued to grow in an environment favorable to the spread of knowledge. This period saw the publication of the Descriptions des Arts et Métiers by the Royal Academy of Sciences (founded by Colbert), followed in the mid-18th century by the first Encyclopédie by Denis Diderot and Jean Le Rond d'Alembert.

The historical legacy of Colbert's industrial policies is significant. Several major French companies trace their origins to former royal manufactories, such as Saint-Gobain (formerly the Manufacture des Glaces de Miroirs), Balsan (formerly the Châteauroux Cloth Manufactory), and the Baccarat Crystalworks. This tradition of state-driven industry continued into the 20th century with the creation of major state-owned enterprises like SNCF (French National Railways), Électricité de France, France Télécom, Sud-Aviation (which became Airbus Industrie in 1957), and SEREB (which became Ariane Espace in 1959). This trend was described by economist Élie Cohen as "high-tech Colbertism", in homage to Louis XIV's former minister.

However, the long-term impact of Colbert's industrial policies remains controversial. Some liberal economists and historians argue that this interventionist approach was inefficient or even harmful compared to the economic liberalism that emerged in Great Britain by the late 18th century, paving the way for the Industrial Revolution. Others, however, praise these interventionist and protectionist measures, advocating for their revival, especially in light of France's significant deindustrialization since the late 20th century.

== Economic and political context ==
=== International context ===
==== Technical and organizational advances ====
Map showing the spread of the printing press in Europe from 1452 to 1500.

From the 15th century onward, the Renaissance spread across Europe, marked by groundbreaking technological advancements, mainly the printing press, invented by Johannes Gutenberg in the 1450s. This innovation was a major step toward mechanization and the widespread dissemination of written knowledge.

Other fields also experienced significant technical progress, including navigation, clockmaking, mining, and banking methods.

While the modern concept of a factory did not yet exist, certain forms of production based on home subcontracting began to emerge. For instance, in the watchmaking industry, a system known as établissage relied on decentralized production. Additionally, early examples of scientific work organization could be seen in the Venetian Arsenal, which specialized in the mass production of warships and galleys.

By the late 16th century, the rise of cotton calicoes—which required sophisticated manufacturing processes—led to the development of a proto-industrial economy in Europe, particularly in small rural workshops. At the same time, silk production, which had traditionally been imported from Asia via the Silk Roads, was gradually mastered in Europe. In France, King Louis XII encouraged the establishment of silk workshops in Languedoc through letters patent.

==== Social evolution ====
In the 16th century, the Protestant Reformation, led by Martin Luther and John Calvin, profoundly reshaped Europe, introducing a new set of values that transformed conceptions of work and life. According to Max Weber, Protestantism rejected the idea that work was merely a punishment for original sin; instead, it elevated labor to a fundamental virtue, a means through which individuals could strive toward God.

While the Catholic Church condemned usury, John Calvin permitted it, making Protestantism more compatible with capitalism and financial speculation. Early economic expansion often occurred in regions that had already begun to break free from feudalism. Venice was dominated by merchant elites, while the Dutch Republic and England had both established parliamentary systems, granting greater political influence to the commercial class.

==== New economic ideas ====
Starting in the 16th century, political thought was no longer dominated by theologians but by secular thinkers primarily concerned with the power of the state. They developed a new school of thought: mercantilism. According to mercantilist thinkers, the state alone embodied the national interest and had to defend it against the actions of other nations, leading to authoritarian, protectionist, and highly aggressive policies. By the 16th century, various branches of mercantilism emerged across European countries: bullionism in Spain, Colbertism (followed by physiocracy under François Quesnay) in France, and commercialism in the Netherlands and England.

This school of thought was pre-capitalist, as it prioritized the power of the state over private wealth accumulation. However, by promoting the idea of a planned, deliberate, and structured economic development—favoring activities with increasing returns—mercantilism inspired political choices that contributed to economic growth in Europe from the 16th century onward.

=== Kingdom of France under the Bourbon dynasty ===
==== Reign of Henry IV: end of the religious wars and economic recovery ====
When Henry IV came to power in 1589, he ended the Wars of Religion by issuing the Edict of Nantes in 1598. However, the kingdom was devastated, and the economy had to be rebuilt. French cloth production had plummeted to a quarter of its pre-war levels between the outbreak of civil war in 1562 and its conclusion in 1598, while the number of silk artisans dropped from 40,000 to fewer than 1,000 over the same period.

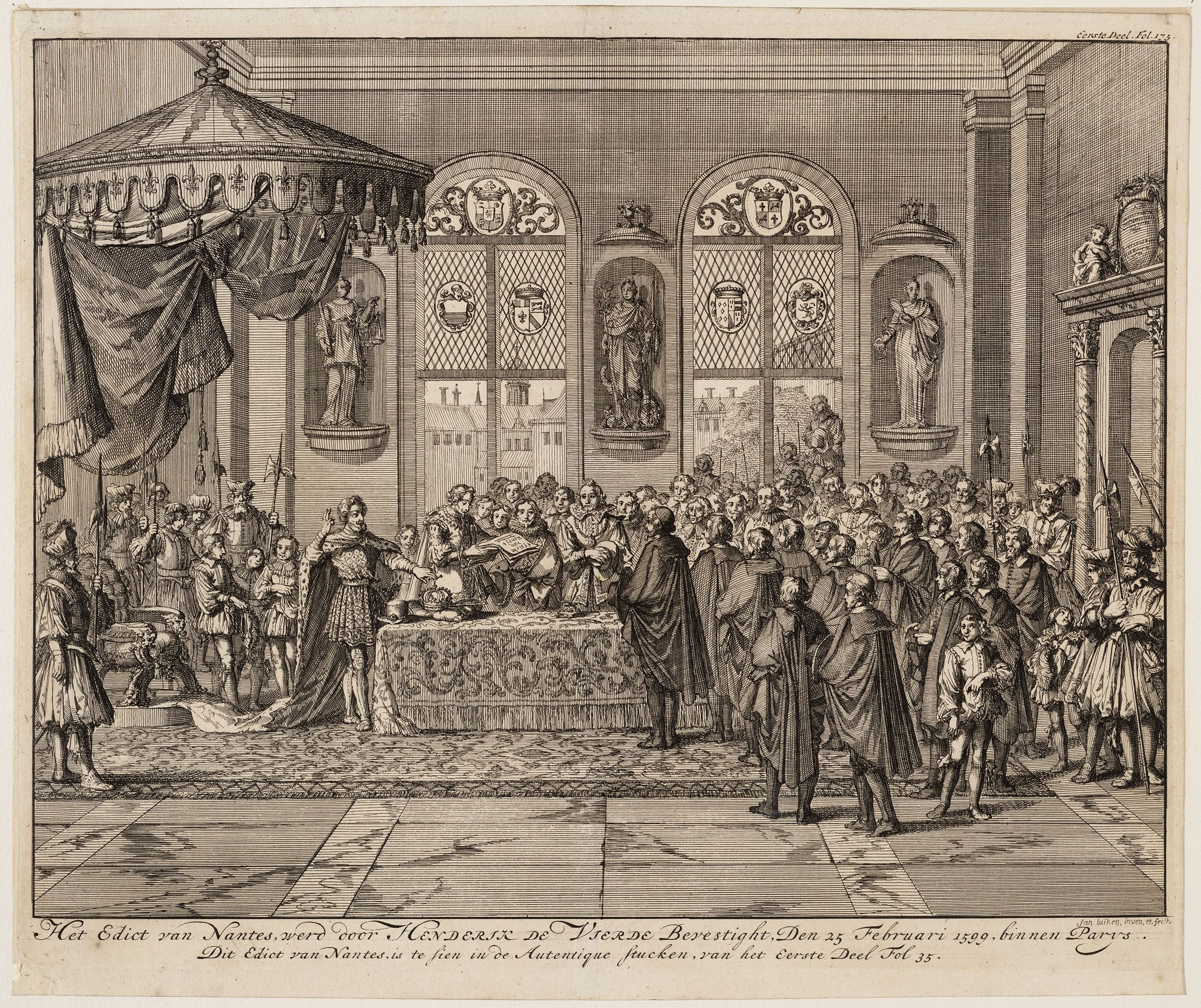
Registration of the Edict of Nantes by the Parliament of Paris in 1599.

Henry IV and his minister, Duke of Sully, sought to end massive tapestry imports from Flanders, which were disrupting France's trade balance. They also aimed to unlock the nation's creative potential, which was stifled by the restrictive guild system.

In 1596, Barthélemy de Laffemas, economist and trade advisor to Henry IV, published a report titled General Regulation for Establishing Manufactories and Workshops in This Kingdom. It outlined a series of recommendations to revive the industry, including banning the import of manufactured goods, naturalizing foreign workers to attract them to France, and creating public workshops for able-bodied unemployed workers.

In 1601, weavers Marc de Comans and François de La Planche received permission to establish a royal tapestry manufactory in workshops in the Saint-Marcel district, later known as the Gobelins Manufactory. In 1606, Henry IV transformed the galleries of the Louvre into a nursery for artists and artisans, competing with the guilds and integrating a wide variety of trades.

At the same time, Barthélemy de Laffemas and the gardener from Nîmes, François Traucat, drew inspiration from agronomist Olivier de Serres and played a crucial role in silk production by planting millions of mulberry trees in Languedoc. In 1605, work began on the Briare Canal, linking the Seine and the Loire—France's first artificial waterway for transportation.

==== Richelieu's economic policy under the reign of Louis XIII ====
The reign of Louis XIII (1610–1643) was primarily marked by the expansion of the kingdom and the strengthening of royal power, orchestrated by Cardinal Richelieu, rather than by proactive economic policies. However, Richelieu did establish the Maritime Company of New France in 1627 to promote the colonization of North America. Meanwhile, France officially entered the transatlantic slave trade in 1642.

==== Colbertism under the reign of Louis XIV ====
Louis XIV ascended the French throne in 1643 after his father died. However, due to his young age, his mother, Anne of Austria, served as regent until 1651. During this period, the Trudon wax manufactory (1643) was established to supply candles for churches and royal palaces, while Anne of Austria supported the revival of the Rouen faience industry (1644).

In March 1661, seven years after his formal coronation, Louis XIV appointed Jean-Baptiste Colbert as Intendant of Finances, later promoting him to Controller-General of Finances in December 1665. Like his predecessors Sully and Richelieu, Colbert sought to close the gap between France's economic potential and its underperforming economy, aiming to eliminate its trade deficit. To reduce imports of luxury goods from Italy and Flanders, he launched a program to establish state-sponsored manufactories and encouraged technology transfers by hiring foreign workers—sometimes even engaging in industrial espionage.

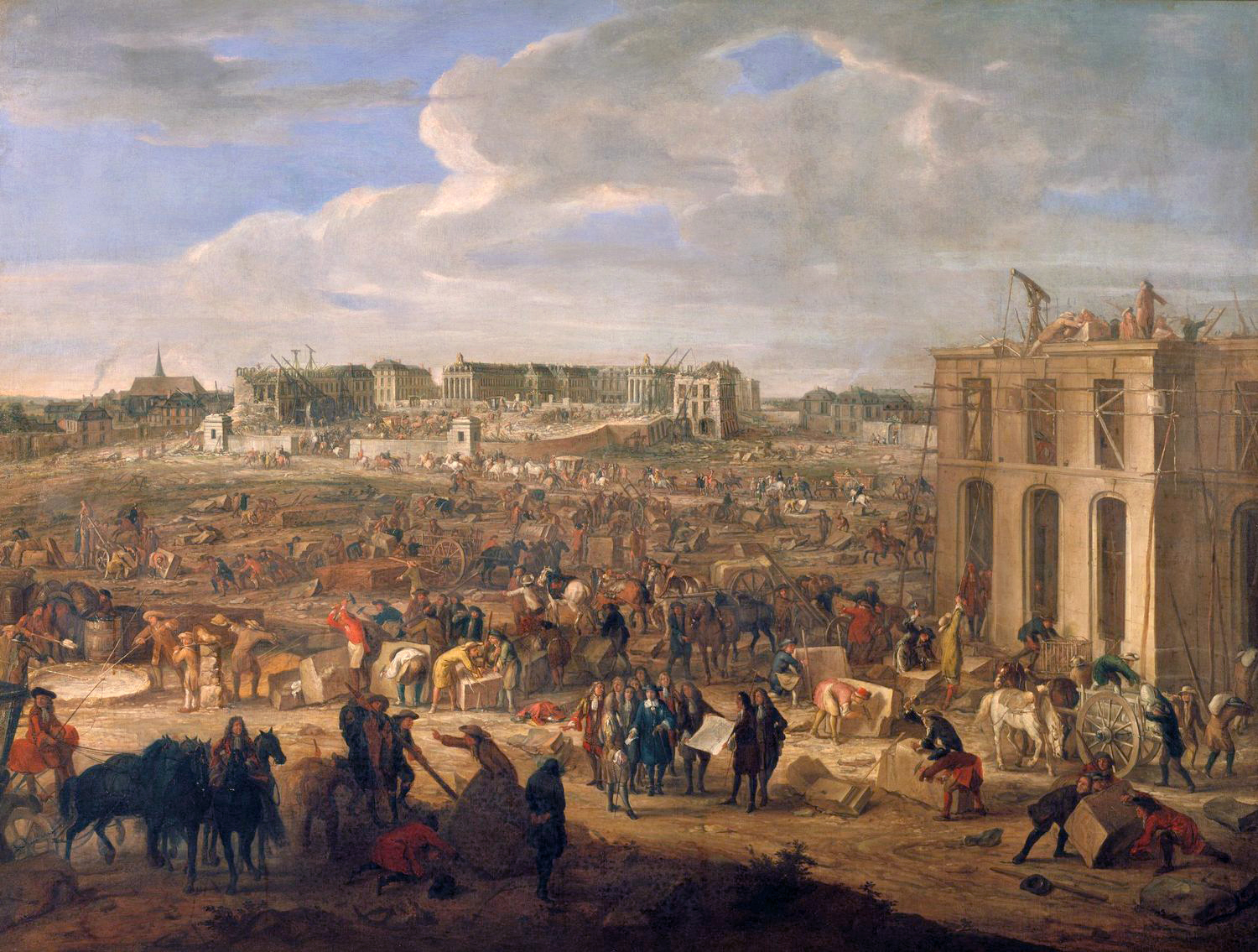
The construction of the Palace of Versailles between 1623 and 1682, painting by Adam van der Meulen, 1669.

In 1664, Colbert founded the Royal Manufactory of Mirrors (which would later become Saint-Gobain), responsible for producing the Hall of Mirrors at the Palace of Versailles (1678–1684). The same year, he authorized the creation of the royal manufactories of high- and low-warp tapestries in Beauvais. Also in 1664, Colbert founded the French East India Company, which significantly expanded France's economic reach—while further entrenching the kingdom in the slave trade. This allowed France to import low-cost raw materials from its colonies.

At the start of the 1670s, Louis XIV revived the Franco-Ottoman alliance, which supported his expansionist policies against the Habsburgs and secured lucrative markets for French industry in the Levant. Large quantities of goods, mainly textiles, were shipped from the ports of Sète and Marseille. In the following years, benefiting from these export subsidies, a dozen royal cloth manufactories were established in Languedoc.

To improve the circulation of goods, Colbert developed new waterways, including the Orléans Canal (1676–1692) and the Canal du Midi (1666–1681), connecting the Atlantic Ocean to the Mediterranean via the Garonne.

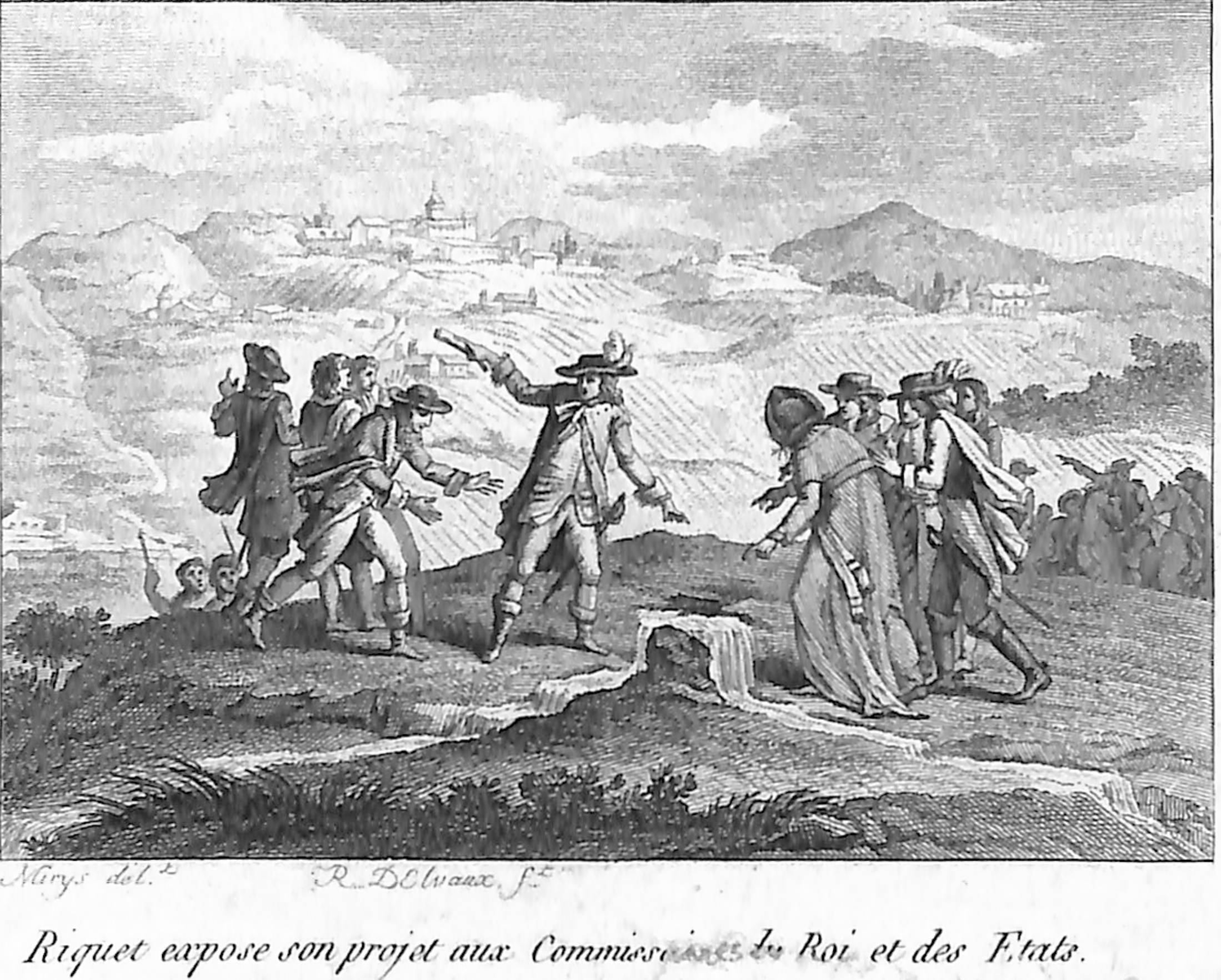
Pierre-Paul Riquet, the architect of the Canal du Midi, presents his project to the King's and States' Commissioners.

In 1678, France's victory in the Dutch War enabled territorial expansion eastward and facilitated exports through the Treaty of Nijmegen, which abolished customs duties at French borders.

However, the revocation of the Edict of Nantes in 1685 (two years after Colbert's death) led to a massive exodus of French Protestants, including many merchants, artisans, and skilled workers. This weakened France's economy while benefiting countries that welcomed them, such as Great Britain, the Dutch Republic, Switzerland, and various German principalities. These economic challenges were partially offset by military expenditures and large-scale construction projects, which sustained domestic demand through public procurement and boosted production and trade.

In the late years of the 17th century, a new war led by Louis XIV against neighboring powers, the War of the League of Augsburg, allowed him to considerably weaken the British and Dutch economies, which benefited French producers and merchants in the textile sector.

From the beginning of the 18th century, a phase of growth in the French manufacturing industry began, lasting—despite some setbacks (wars, plague epidemics, commercial crises)—until the Seven Years' War (1756–1763). The Council and Bureau of Commerce, a royal institution and ancestor of the chambers of commerce, intended to stimulate exports, was founded in 1700. The 18th century was thus characterized by a close symbiosis between provincial manufacturing regions and the dominant capital, which provided financial support and the conveniences of its commercial structures.

==== Reign of Louis XV and the Age of Enlightenment ====
After the death of Louis XIV in 1715, his great-grandson Louis XV succeeded him, ascending the throne at the age of five, like his predecessor (his uncle Philippe d'Orléans served as regent until 1723).

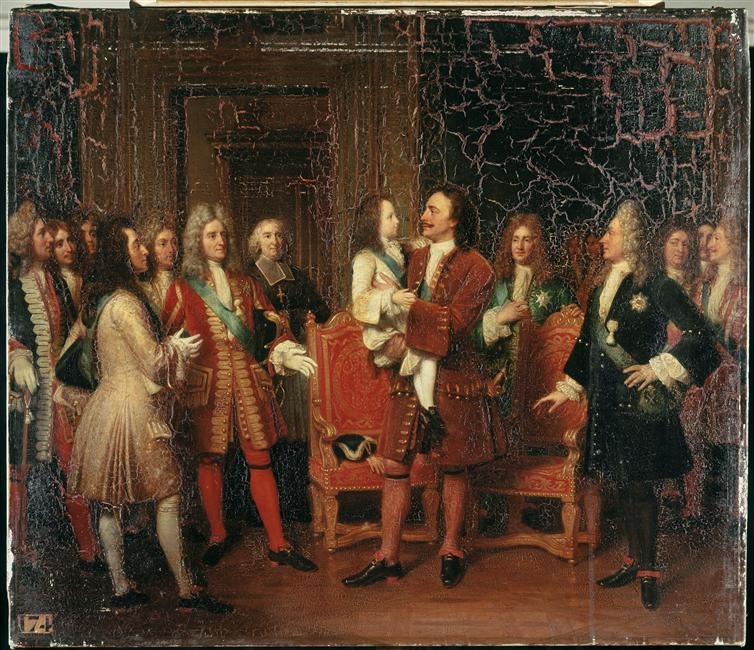
Meeting between the seven-year-old King Louis XV and the Russian Tsar Peter I, the Great, during his trip to the Kingdom of France in 1717.

Two years later, Tsar Peter I the Great of Russia undertook a three-month journey to France with the express intention of drawing inspiration from the kingdom's industrial development to modernize his empire. He met the seven-year-old King Louis XV and visited the royal manufactories of the Gobelins (tapestry), Abbeville (luxury cloth), and Charleville (firearms), as well as the Marly pumping system in the Versailles Park, the Champagne cellars in Reims, and the Royal Academy of Sciences (founded by Colbert in 1666). Upon his return to Russia, he founded the Saint Petersburg Academy of Sciences in 1724. Thus, barely half a century after the beginning of Colbert's interventionist policies, the industrial development of the Kingdom of France had become an example for Europe.

In 1730, Louis XV tasked his Secretary of State for War, Nicolas-Prosper Bauyn d'Angervilliers, with creating a bladed weapons manufactory in Klingenthal, Alsace. In the context of the emerging exploitation of coal mines, a decree of the Council of State was issued in 1744, reaffirming that mines were subject to the rights attached to the Crown's Domain and Sovereignty.

At the same time, the reign of Louis XV, which occupied most of the 18th century, was marked by the "Age of Enlightenment," characterized by great literary, philosophical, and cultural richness, as well as an ambition to combat obscurantism and promote knowledge.

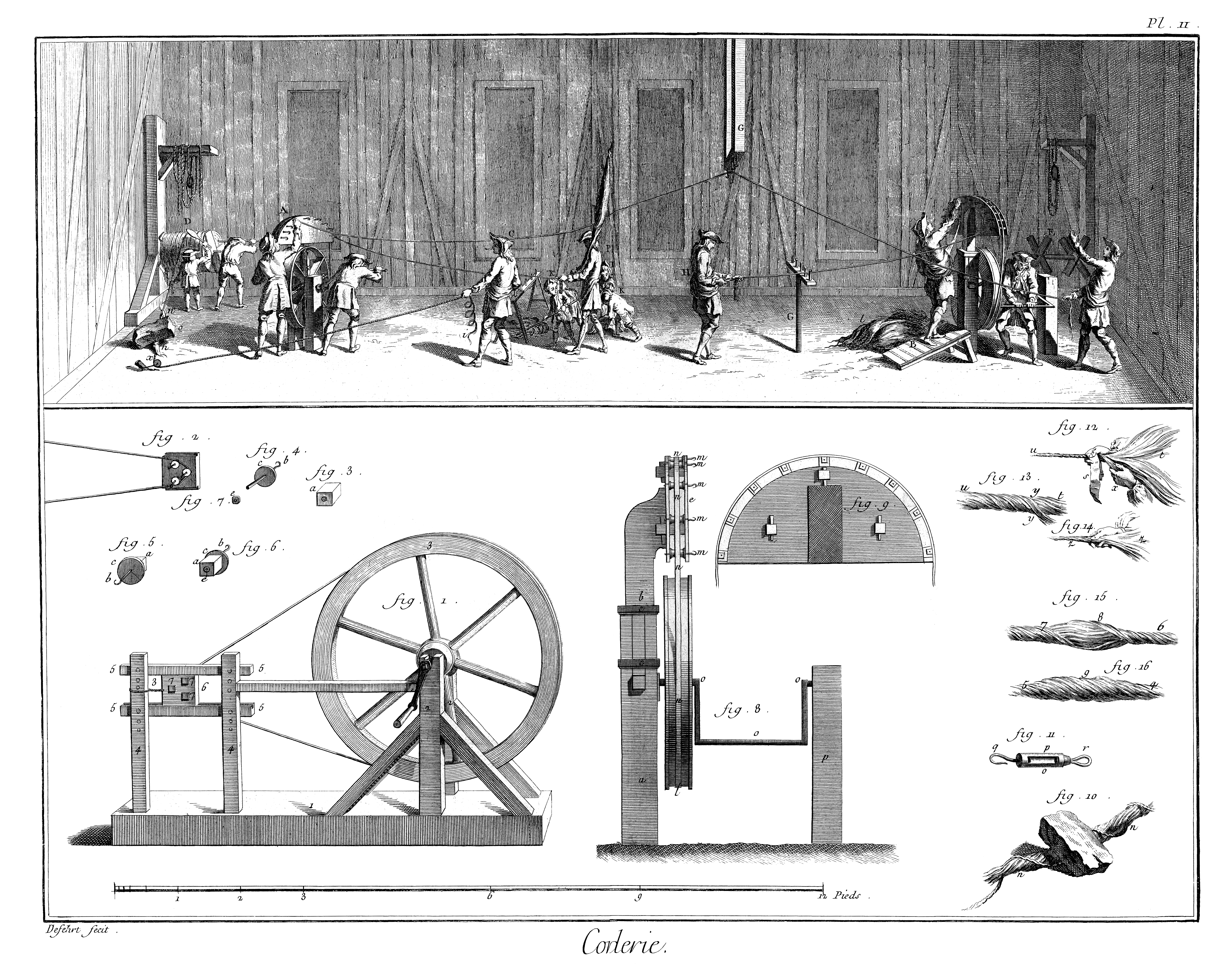
Illustration from the Encyclopédie for the article "Corderie" written by the botanist Duhamel du Monceau.

In this context, the first Encyclopédie was written between 1751 and 1772, with the aim of synthesizing and disseminating the technical and scientific knowledge of the time, with several articles describing industrial techniques and processes. Some drew inspiration from or reproduced engravings included in Descriptions des arts et métiers, a collection of works published at the same time by the Royal Academy of Sciences. These works of compilation, synthesis, and dissemination of knowledge in science and engineering benefited the national economy by spreading artisanal and industrial expertise. For example, the article by physicist René-Antoine Ferchault de Réaumur (who directed Descriptions des arts et métiers at the beginning of its publication), The Art of Converting Wrought Iron into Steel, enabled the Kingdom of France to manufacture this metal, which had previously been imported.

==== Reign of Louis XVI and the French Revolution ====
The reign of Louis XVI was relatively short compared to his predecessors: ascending the throne in May 1774, he was overthrown eighteen years later by the French Revolution before being executed in January 1793 at the age of thirty-eight. The very year of his accession to the throne, in October 1774, he granted the title of royal manufactory to the Dugny factory of wax, candles, tapers, and torches. His reign was marked by France's intervention in the American War of Independence in 1778, which benefited French industries, particularly the firearms manufactories of Charleville and Saint-Étienne, as well as the sailcloth manufactory in Agen. The playwright, writer, and businessman Pierre-Augustin Caron de Beaumarchais was commissioned by Louis XVI to organize the logistics of exporting French-made weapons to the American insurgents.

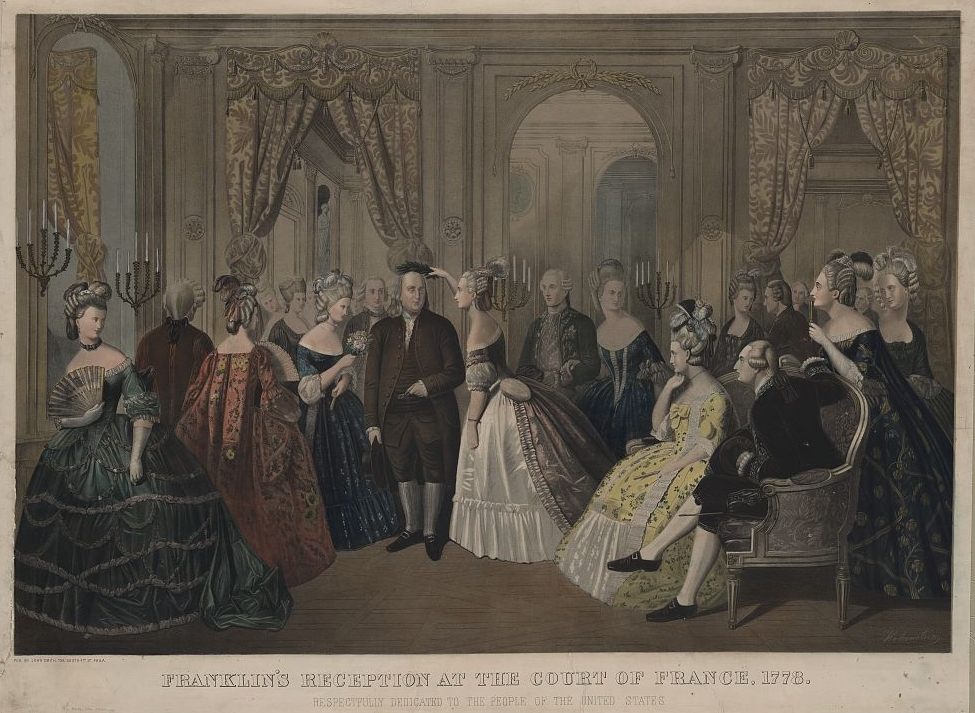
Benjamin Franklin received by King Louis XVI and Queen Marie-Antoinette at the French court in 1778 to sign the treaty of the Franco-American alliance.

However, this intervention proved extremely costly for the kingdom, and the deterioration of public finances, combined with poor harvests exacerbated by a particularly harsh winter, created the conditions for the French Revolution, which ended the monarchy in 1792.

Nevertheless, the reign of Louis XVI was marked by several progressive reforms, such as the abolition of serfdom in 1779 and the Edict of Versailles, which in 1787 reinstated the principles of the Edict of Nantes a century after its revocation by Louis XIV. That same year, Louis XVI ennobled Christophe-Philippe Oberkampf, a Protestant industrialist of German origin, four years after granting his Indian cotton print manufactory the title of the royal manufactory. Finally, it was under Louis XVI that the Paris School of Mines was created—one of France's oldest and most selective engineering schools—by an ordinance issued on March 19, 1783, at a time when the mining industry was in full expansion.

In the following century, capitalizing on the technological and organizational innovations of the 17th and 18th centuries, part of Europe, including France, transitioned from a predominantly agrarian and artisanal society to a commercial and industrial one, in a process known as the "Industrial Revolution."

== Main royal manufactories by sector ==
The industrial policy initiated by Jean-Baptiste Colbert and continued by his successors emphasized the creation of protected and privileged manufactories, often through royal monopolies, subsidies, and tax exemptions. These manufactories were typically established in major urban centers or alongside existing guilds. Colbert viewed state support as a form of educational protectionism, intended to foster domestic industry until it could become self-sustaining. Monopolies and privileges were usually temporary, often limited to twenty years.

In a letter to the aldermen of Lyon, Colbert wrote: "The inhabitants of this city would do well to consider the favors granted to their industry as crutches with which they should quickly learn to walk on their own, as I intend to take them away afterward."

State intervention also aimed to enhance competitiveness through the transfer of skills and technology, facilitated by the recruitment of foreign specialists and by imposing quality standards through royal ordinances. While many royal manufactories were founded directly by the Crown, existing workshops could also be granted royal status. Examples include the textile workshops of Aubusson and Alençon (1665), the Jouy manufactory (1770), and the Portieux glassworks after the annexation of Lorraine to France (1767).

=== Textile manufactories ===
==== Tapestry production ====
===== Gobelins manufactory =====
The Gobelins Manufactory is a historic tapestry factory located in Paris, France. It was officially established in April 1601 under the reign of Henry IV, with the support of his commerce advisor Barthélemy de Laffemas. A royal privilege was granted to two Flemish tapestry weavers, Marc de Comans and François de La Planche, allowing them to operate tapestry workshops in France. The privilege prohibited others from founding similar establishments for a period of fifteen years.

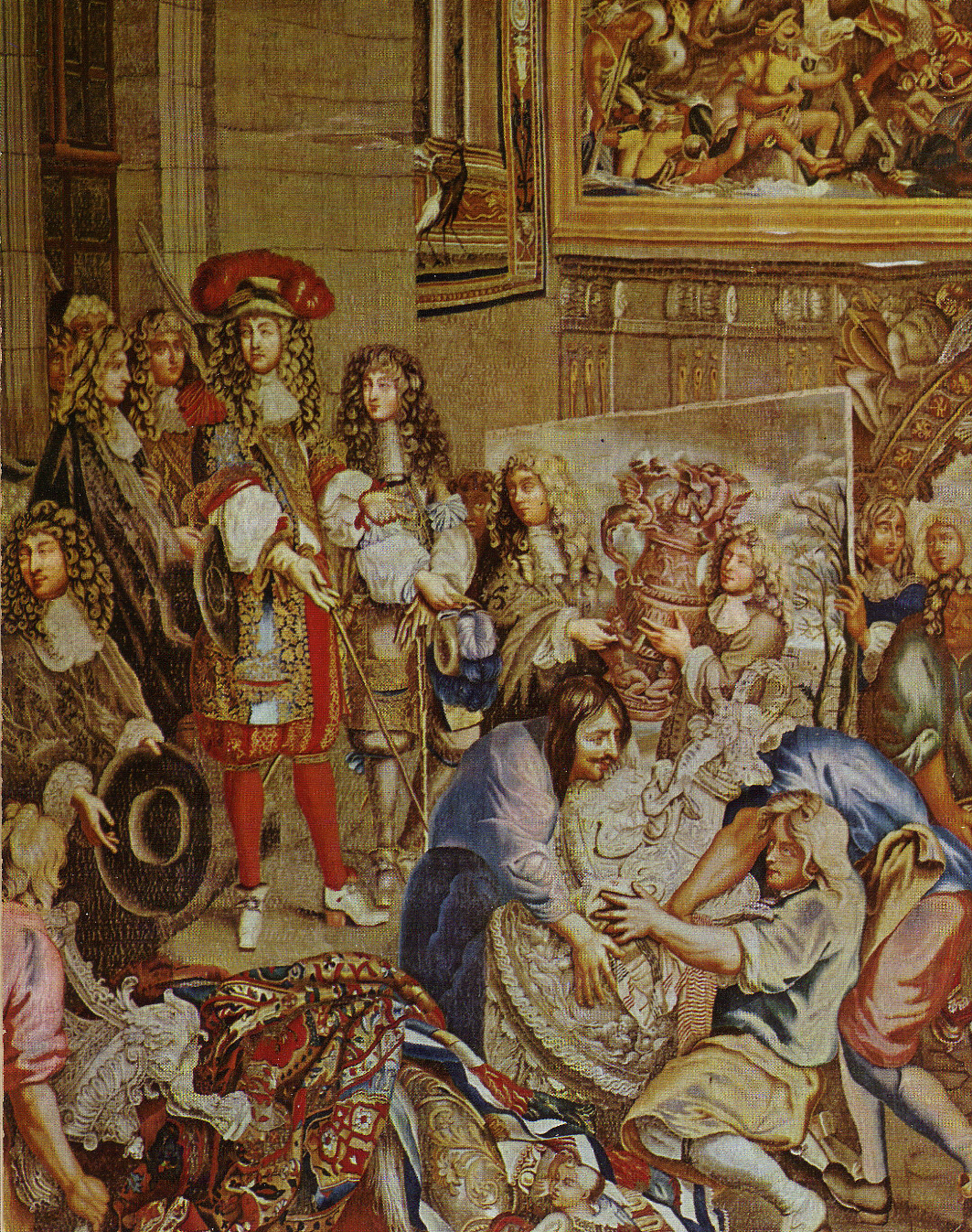
Louis XIV visiting the Gobelins factory with Colbert in 1667.

Initially, the workshops operated independently in various locations. In 1662, Jean-Baptiste Colbert, minister of finance under Louis XIV, centralized the operations by merging them into a single manufactory on the current site of the Gobelins. He placed the institution under the direction of Charles Le Brun, the king's first painter, who oversaw production until his death in 1690.

During the 18th century, the manufactory was directed by several architects and designers, including Robert de Cotte, Jules-Robert de Cotte, Jean-Charles Gasnier d'Isle, and Jacques-Germain Soufflot.

After the French Revolution, the manufactory continued to operate under the First Empire, producing tapestries that celebrated the military achievements of Napoleon Bonaparte.

In 1937, the Gobelins Manufactory was incorporated into the Mobilier National, the government agency responsible for furnishing official buildings. As of the 21st century, the manufactory employs approximately thirty artisans and operates fifteen looms, producing an average of six to seven tapestries annually.

===== Savonnerie manufactory =====
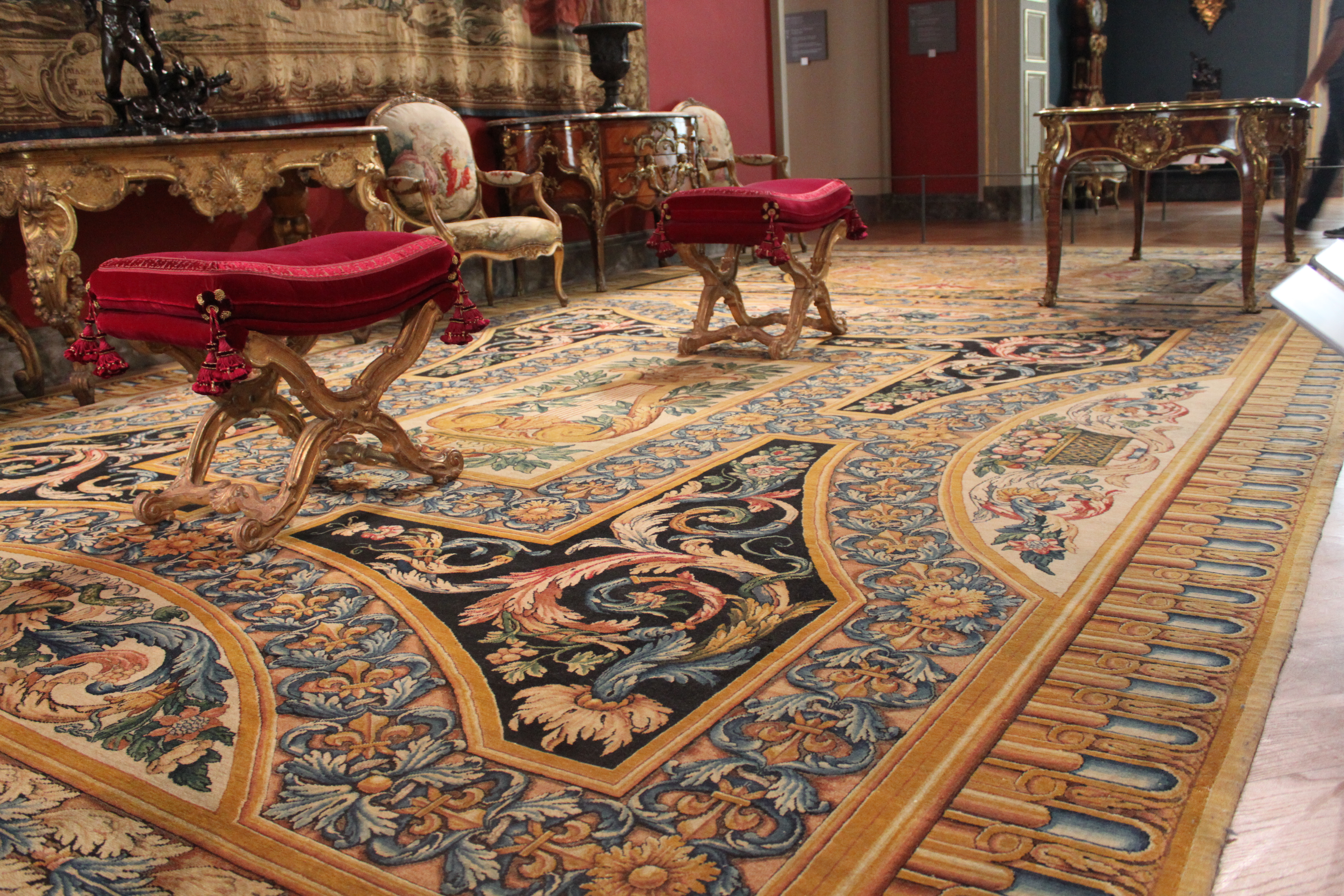
Carpet from the Savonnerie manufactory, after Charles Le Brun, made for the Galerie d'Apollon.

The Savonnerie Manufactory was founded in Paris in 1650 for the production of luxury pile carpets. In 1663, it was reorganized by Jean-Baptiste Colbert and placed under the artistic direction of Charles Le Brun, alongside the Gobelins Manufactory. It was officially integrated into the Gobelins by King Charles X in 1825.

===== Beauvais manufactory =====
The Beauvais tapestry manufactory was founded in 1664 by Colbert to develop domestic production and reduce the importation of Flemish tapestries. Unlike the Gobelins manufactory, whose production was mainly for the king, the Beauvais manufactory initially targeted the private market. In 1684, it became royal property, passing from one king to the next until the French Revolution. The painter Jean-Baptiste Huet took over its direction in 1790. Closed in 1793, the Beauvais manufactory reopened the following year as property of the Republican government, but its activity declined in the 19th century.

Administratively attached to the Mobilier National (which belongs to the French Ministry of Culture) in 1936 (as the Gobelins was in 1937), the manufactory was transferred to Aubusson in 1939 after its buildings in Beauvais were bombed during World War II, before being relocated back to Paris.

===== Manufacture of Aubusson =====
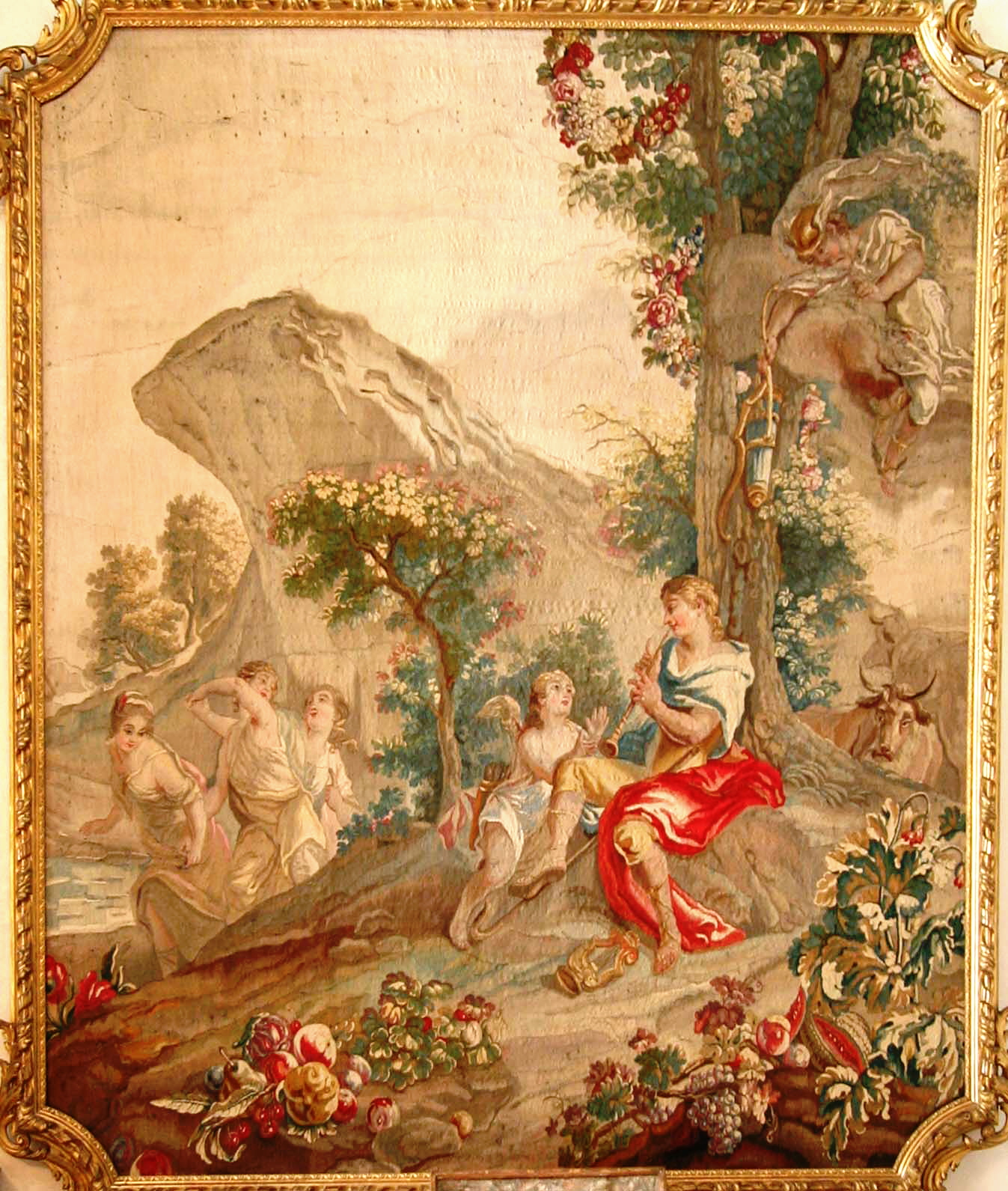
The Education of Apollo (Musée Grobet-Labadié in Marseille), wool and silk tapestry from the Royal Manufactory of Aubusson, 18th century.

Weaving workshops have been documented in the town of Aubusson, near Limoges, since the mid-16th century. By the time of Louis XIV, the industry was in decline. In 1665, the king sought to revive it by granting all private workshops the designation of "royal manufacture" and providing them with work-related privileges. The royal painter Isaac Moillon was made available to the workshops and created numerous cartoons for tapestries produced in Aubusson. The distinctiveness of the Aubusson royal manufacture lay in the fact that it was not a centralized industrial establishment, but rather a collection of existing workshops that had received a royal designation.

In 1732, a royal edict provided further support by assigning a painter appointed by the monarchy to assist with design execution, as well as a dyer to advise the various manufacturers. The edict also regulated the use of colors in tapestries, mandating, among other things, the inclusion of blue borders and requiring that the manufacturer's mark follow the mention of "Aubusson," rather than indicate the original workshop. These regulations, however, were not always strictly observed; several surviving examples show that producers often prioritized emphasizing their status as a Royal Manufacture.

Many Aubusson tapestries are now housed in the Cité Internationale de la Tapisserie, which opened in 2016 and succeeded the previous museum that operated from 1982 to 2016. The institution also hosts temporary exhibitions of contemporary works, including those inspired by the creations of J.R.R. Tolkien and Hayao Miyazaki.

===== Manufacture of Toile de Jouy =====
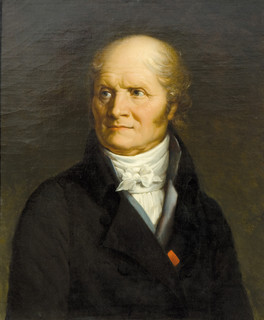
Christophe-Philippe Oberkampf, founder of the "manufacture Oberkampf", and major player in the cotton industry in France.

The Manufacture of Toile de Jouy was established in 1760 in the town of Jouy-en-Josas, near Paris, by Christophe-Philippe Oberkampf, a German-born industrialist who became a naturalized French citizen around 1770, and Antoine de Tavannes. The location was selected due to the favorable chemical properties of the Bièvre River for washing textiles. Known as the "Oberkampf Manufacture," it quickly became one of the most prominent textile printing factories (indienneries) in Europe during the 18th century and played a significant role in the history of decorative arts.

In 1783, more than two decades after its founding, King Louis XVI conferred the title of "royal manufacture" upon the factory. In 1787, Oberkampf was ennobled by a letter of merit. Despite the upheaval of the French Revolution, the manufacture continued operations. In 1797, Oberkampf introduced the first machine for printing Indian textiles and developed new colors in the following years. By the early 19th century, when he had almost a monopoly on printed fabrics, Napoleon I visited his workshops in 1806 and awarded him the Legion of Honor. At its peak, the enterprise employed more than 1,300 weavers, engravers, and colorists. However, its growth halted with Oberkampf's death in October 1815, following the fall of the First French Empire.

In the years that followed, industrial production gradually overtook traditional craftsmanship, leading to lower textile prices that the Oberkampf Manufacture struggled to match. The factory closed in 1843. By that time, the cotton industry—greatly advanced by Oberkampf's efforts—employed approximately 300,000 workers in France.

===== Manufacture of Abbeville carpets =====
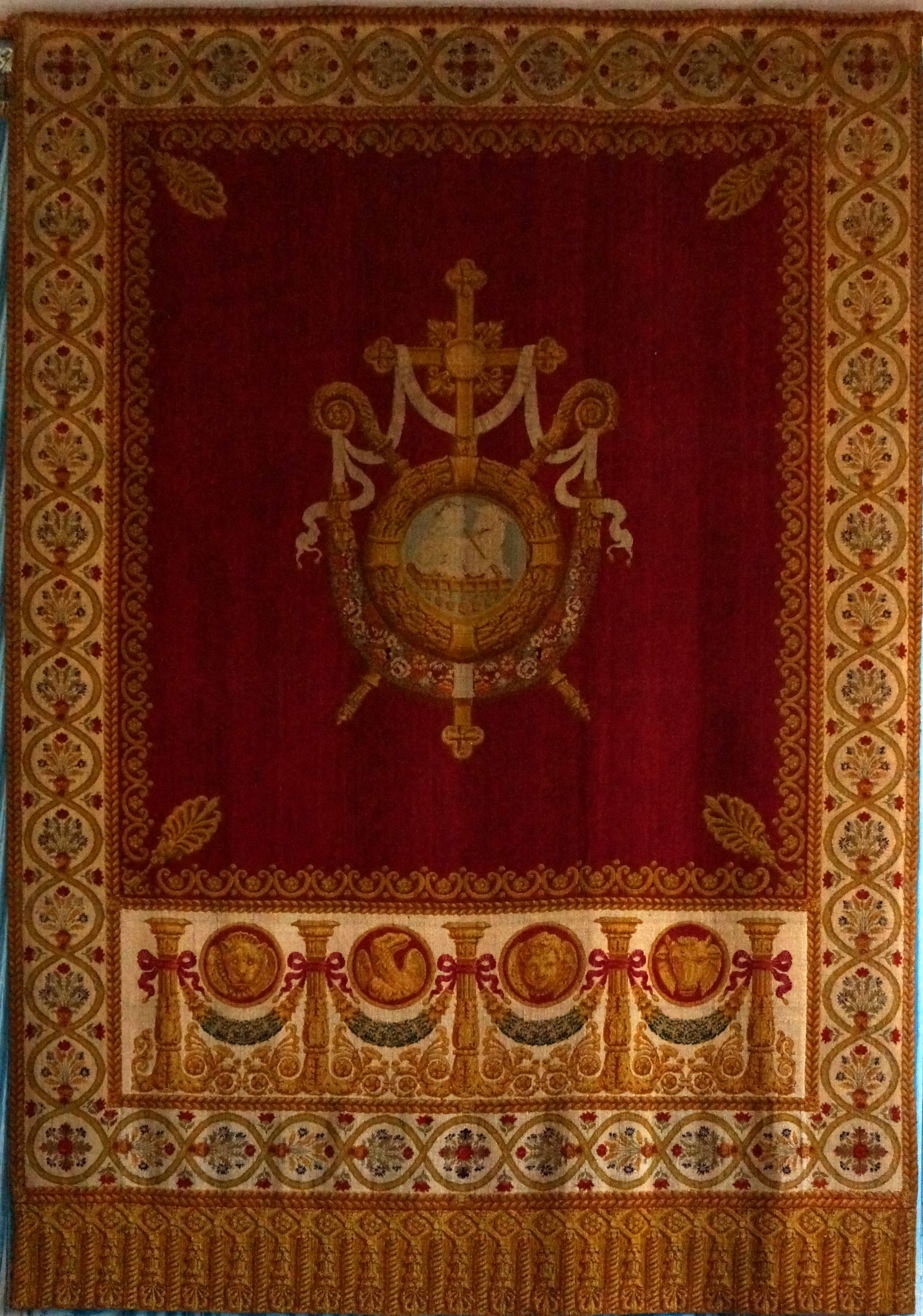
Carpet from the coronation of Charles X.

In 1667, Colbert brought the Flemish artisan Philippe Leclerc to Abbeville in Picardy to establish a carpet manufacturing workshop specializing in "mocades" (a type of textile). The business was taken over in 1686 by Jacques d'Homassel and later his son-in-law Jacques Hecquet, remaining in the family until 1823.

The company was then succeeded by the brothers Pierre-Antoine and Joseph Maximilien Vayson. During their administration, the manufacture was relocated to the former buildings of the Notre-Dame de Willencourt Abbey and provided carpets for the coronation of Charles X. In 1867, Abbeville's main carpet manufacture closed, allowing Jean-Antoine Vayson, son of Pierre-Antoine, to centralize all his operations there. Carpet and rug production in Abbeville continued until 1912.

==== Fabrication of cloth ====
In the 18th century, Louis XIV and Colbert initiated the development of the cloth industry, hoping to compete with English and Dutch production. In 1670, at Colbert's request, the Levant Company was created to sell Languedocian cloth in the Ottoman Empire, through the port cities of Constantinople, Smyrna, and Alexandria. This industry expanded in the late 17th century when the War of the League of Augsburg weakened English and Dutch competitors, and Marseille merchants took control of the trade with the creation of the Bureau des Draps in 1693, which established a long trade route connecting Languedoc to the Échelles du Levant (trading posts in the Eastern Mediterranean).

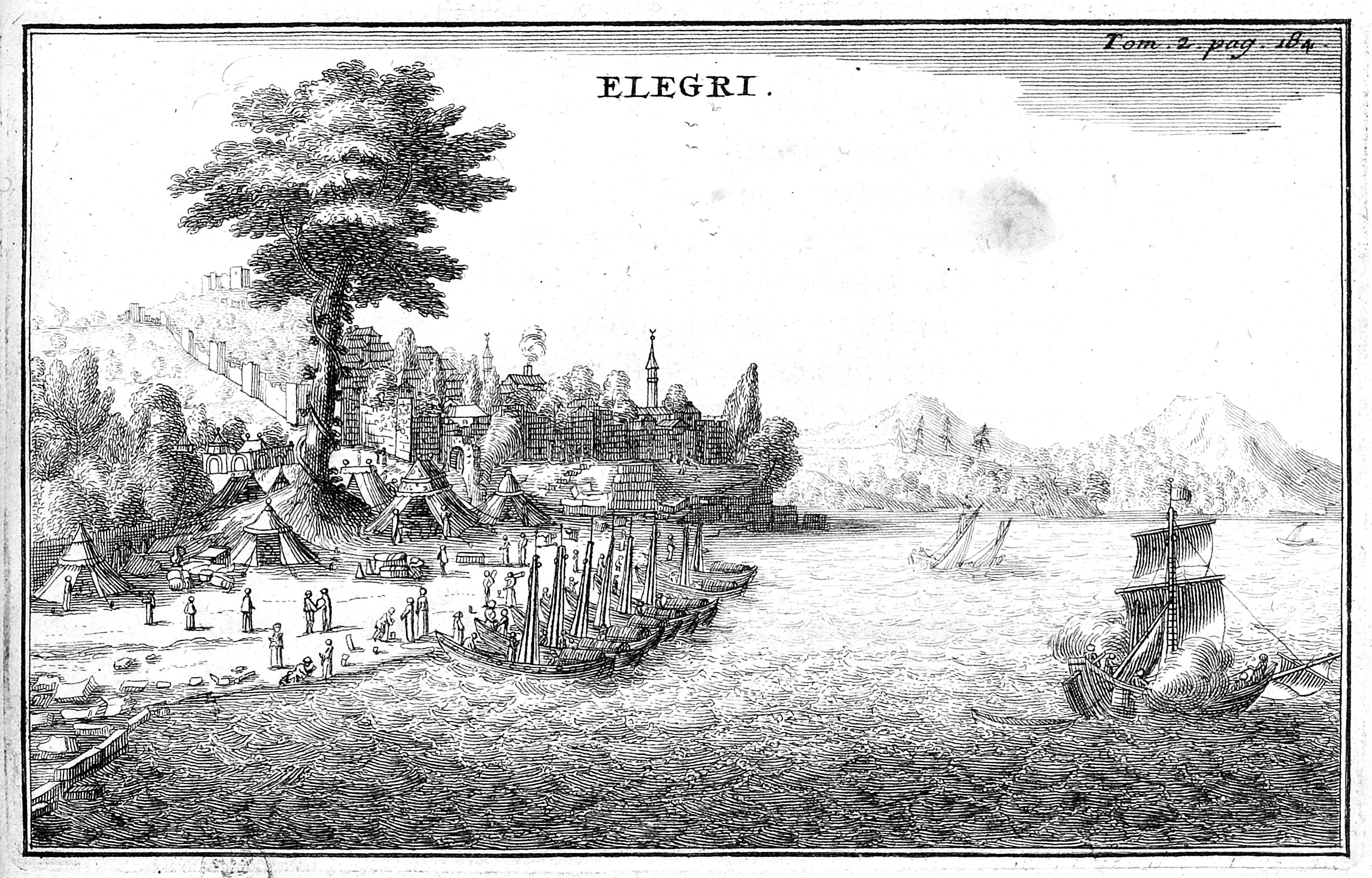
Engraving from Relation d'un voyage au Levant (Account of a Journey to the Levant) by the explorer Joseph Pitton de Tournefort (1717).

From approximately 10,000 pieces in 1700, shipments from the port of Marseille to the Eastern Mediterranean (Ottoman Empire and Persia) reached nearly 85,000 by 1775. Between 1757 and 1776, this region absorbed nearly 90% of Languedocian cloth production.

Producers and merchants were particularly attentive to product quality, a crucial factor in gaining access to distant markets. They relied on the "label" system to facilitate product identification based on origin and characteristics. To ensure the market received selected, competitive products, Colbert subjected production to strict regulations. Cloth underwent multiple inspections by a corps of manufacture inspectors before being shipped to the Échelles du Levant. Meanwhile, Marseille merchants' agents in the Levant provided insights into consumer preferences, tastes, and local fashion trends, prompting French producers to adapt by varying raw material and dye imports.

Several cloth manufactures were established in the Languedoc region, as well as in Île-de-France (Chevreuse), Alsace (Sedan), Berry (Châteauroux), and Picardy (Abbeville).

===== Royal cloth manufactures in Languedoc =====
Languedoc, historically very active in textile production and export, was particularly encouraged by the monarchy to host manufactures dedicated to cloth production. At the beginning of the 18th century, Languedoc had around a dozen royal manufactures—nine near Carcassonne—of varying sizes, along with about fifty private ones. The main royal manufactures were:

- The Saptes Cloth Manufacture, established in Carcassonne in 1667 by Colbert, employed 200 workers by 1689. Ten years later, facing competition from numerous newly established regional manufacturers, it was forced to cease operations before being revived by the state in the early 18th century. It closed permanently around 1780.
- Villeneuvette Manufacture, near Lodève, was founded in 1675 and declared a royal manufacture in 1677. Its high-quality production was intended for the Levant, though exports had varying success. In 1803, it was taken over by the Maistre family and began producing military cloth for the army. From the late Second Empire until its closure in 1954, it operated under a paternalistic business model theorized by sociologist Frédéric Le Play. The site, now part of the commune of Villeneuvette, was listed as a historical monument in 2014.
- The Royal Manufacture of La Trivalle, founded in Carcassonne in 1694 by Guillaume III Castanier, received the status and privileges granted to royal industrial establishments in 1696. After continuous growth and multiple expansions during the 18th century, it went bankrupt in 1789. The building was purchased in 1812 and converted into a mechanized wool spinning mill.
- The Montolieu Royal Cloth Manufacture, near Carcassonne, was built by order of Louis XV in 1739 and reached its peak in the second half of the 18th century. However, the wars following the French Revolution slowed production and trade. The building, later transformed into a guesthouse in the early 20th century, was listed as a historical monument in 2004.

===== Royal cloth manufactures in Northern France =====
In the northern part of the Kingdom of France, the main royal cloth manufactures included:

- Le Dijonval Royal Manufacture, founded in 1646 in Sedan, was granted the privilege of producing fine cloth in the Dutch style. The site expanded throughout the 18th century and modernized in the 19th century with steam-powered machinery. Additional workshops were built, some leased to other industrialists. Operations ceased in 1958, and the building was classified as a historical monument in 1992.
- The Rames Manufacture, created in Abbeville in 1665 by Colbert and Josse Van Robais, employed 3,000 workers at its peak around 1724. The company flourished in the late 18th and early 19th centuries before being acquired by industrialist Janin Vayson in 1867. It ceased operations in the 20th century, and the building was designated a historical monument in 1986.
- The Chevreuse Ribbon Manufacture, established in the Paris region by Colbert in 1670, but it ceased operations after only a few years.

===== The Châteauroux cloth manufacture =====
Unlike the other cloth manufactures mentioned above, the Châteauroux Manufacture, founded in 1665 as a "collective royal manufacture," remains active today under the name Balsan.

A significant development occurred in 1751 when Louis XV authorized the establishment of a royal cloth manufacture within the park of Châteauroux Castle, where workshops specifically designed for textile production were constructed. Their simple, regular layout enabled efficient organization of labor, facilitated supervision, and contributed to improved production quality.

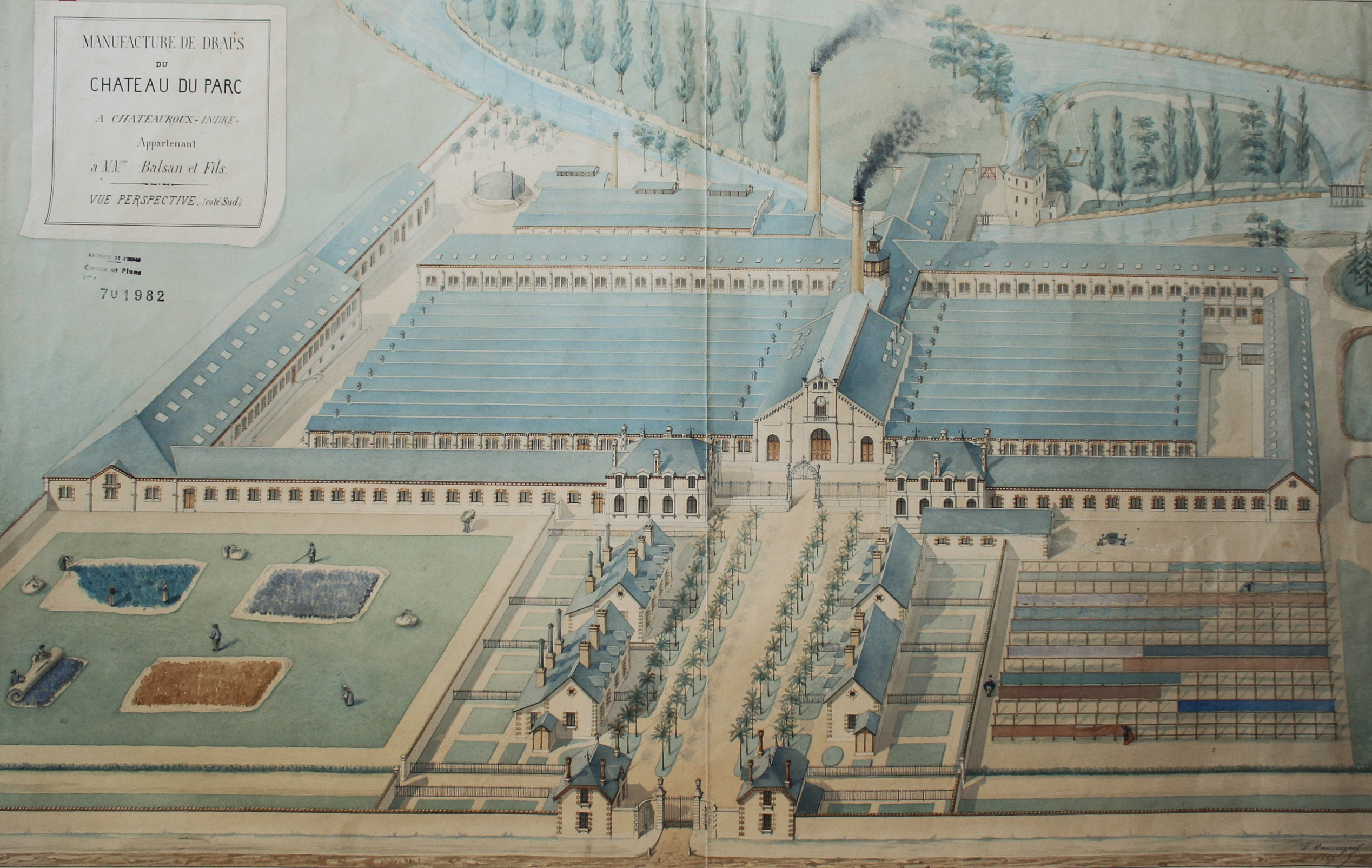
Cloth factory of Parc de Châteauroux, engraving from 1862.

Beginning in the 19th century, the workshops were mechanized, with production supplemented by home-based spinning performed by numerous workers. In 1859, the manufacture was acquired by Pierre Balsan, who gave his name to the company and relocated operations to a new six-hectare facility west of the original site. The Balsan family managed the enterprise until 1974. In 1973, Balsan shifted its focus to carpet manufacturing and relocated once more, this time to Arthon, near Châteauroux, where it continues to operate.

==== Textile production for clothing ====
===== Silk stocking manufacture =====
The establishment of the silk stocking manufacture in Neuilly-sur-Seine in 1656 resulted from a royal privilege granted to Jean Hindret. However, this monopoly was not respected, and several other silk stocking manufactures were founded in Lyon and Orange in 1662, followed by others in Nîmes, Montauban, and Chambéry. Facing difficulties due to competition and a shortage of skilled labor after the revocation of the Edict of Nantes in 1685, the silk stocking manufacture ceased operations by the late 17th century.

===== Alençon royal manufacture =====
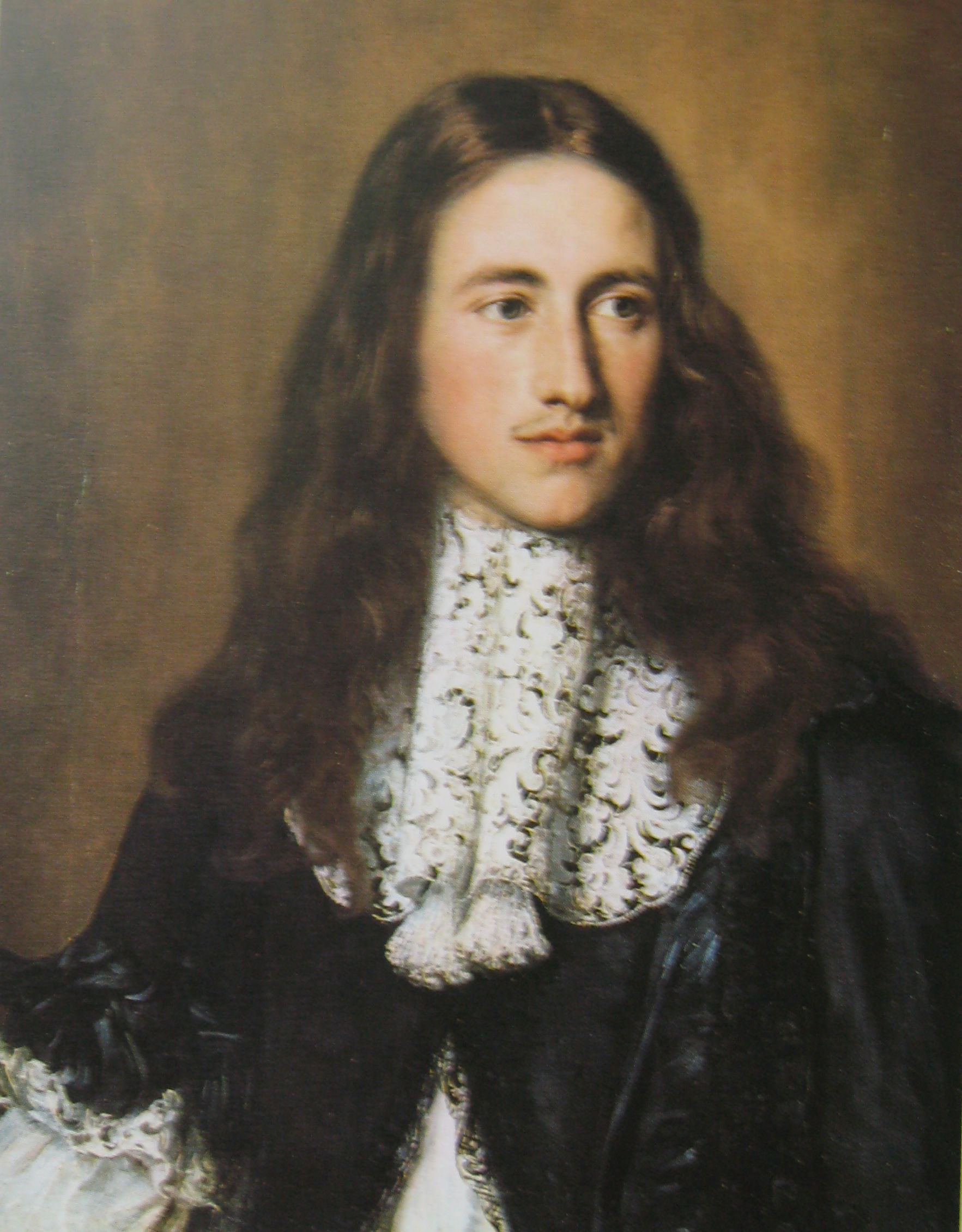
Portrait of a member of the Chigi family, by Jacob Ferdinand Voet, on display at the Museum of Fine Arts and Lace in Alençon.

In the 1650s, the Venetian Point lace technique was introduced to Alençon, Normandy, by Marthe La Perrière, a French noblewoman and engineer. She refined the technique to create Point d'Alençon lace, for which she received a royal privilege from Louis XIV in 1665. Anticipating principles later associated with Taylorism, she implemented a scientific work organization, assigning specialized tasks to different workers and providing employment to thousands in the Alençon area. Her designs were influenced by Charles Le Brun, the king's chief painter and director of the Gobelins, until his death in 1690.

In the 18th century, competition from Flemish bobbin lace and shifting fashion trends—affecting both men's and women's clothing—led to a decline in demand for Alençon lace, resulting in reduced orders up to the French Revolution. In February 1794, the revolutionary leader Saint-Just granted a subsidy to Alençon in an effort to preserve the needle lace industry, a concern later echoed by Napoleon I as part of his broader policy of supporting luxury industries.

At the beginning of the 19th century, production was revived by the Congregation of the Sisters of Providence of Alençon, who preserved the craft despite increasing competition from machine-made lace. Their efforts allowed the tradition to survive through a small clientele of dedicated patrons. Alençon lace was inscribed on UNESCO's Representative List of the Intangible Cultural Heritage of Humanity on November 16, 2010, after being included in the Inventory of Intangible Cultural Heritage in France. The manufacture, still in operation with about ten specialized workers, has been attached to the Mobilier National since 1976.

==== Textiles for furnishing ====
Upholstery velvet was used to decorate the interiors of homes, particularly furniture such as armchairs and sofas. Since the Middle Ages, the city of Amiens had been renowned for its cloth production, made possible by woad cultivation. Velvet, however, did not appear until the 17th century, when it was made from linen and mohair.

After revocating the Edict of Nantes by the Edict of Fontainebleau in 1685, Huguenot manufacturers had to leave France to maintain their religion. Many of them, including some from Amiens, settled in Utrecht in the Dutch Republic. The quality of their production established the reputation of upholstery velvet, which became known as "Utrecht velvet."

To compete with Dutch and Italian production, a Royal Manufacture of Floral Fabrics was established in Amiens in 1755 by Alexandre Bonvallet, a cloth merchant from Picardy. He developed the embossing of velvet using a cylinder and relief printing with a copper plate. This type of production gave rise to Amiens Velvet, which brought the city great fame until the 20th century. The manufacture ceased operations during the interwar period, but its technique and several cylinders were taken over by the company Tosccan, which has been located since 2017 in the former premises of the Cosserat Velvet Manufacture in Amiens.

A second royal manufacture, Morgan et Delahaye, was established in 1765 in the Picardy capital and began producing cotton velvet for clothing and "Utrecht velvet" for furnishings. It was so successful that it dominated the industrial production of Amiens for two centuries.

==== Production of Sailcloth ====
The Royal Sailcloth Manufacture was built between 1764 and 1780 in Agen by the merchant Pierre Gounon, under authorization from the financial intendant Daniel-Charles Trudaine, from whom it derived its royal status. Like the royal firearms manufactures, the Agen sailcloth manufacture benefited greatly from the American War of Independence, which spurred significant growth.

However, the manufacture quickly entered a period of decline at the beginning of the 19th century, suffering from the effects of Napoleon I's Continental Blockade against Great Britain and the decline of sailing ships in favor of steamships. Currently, the building serves as a barracks for the Agen Gendarmerie.

=== Manufactures in glass and crystal production ===
The use of glass for making windows, known since Roman antiquity, remained rare during the Middle Ages except for stained glass. At the end of the 13th century, Venetian glassworks were established on the island of Murano to prevent fire hazards in the city. Their isolation allowed them to innovate and refine their expertise while protecting their manufacturing secrets. As Venetian glass became a valuable export, Colbert sought to replicate their methods and founded several glassworks in France. The three royal manufactures detailed below, dedicated to the production of glass and mirrors, have since merged into today's major company Saint-Gobain.

==== Production of glass and mirrors ====
===== Royal mirror glass manufacture =====
Colbert quickly took an interest in the glass and mirror industry, which was monopolized by the Republic of Venice, exporting Venetian glass across Europe at high costs. To uncover their manufacturing secrets, Colbert ordered the espionage of Venetian glassmakers and successfully lured some to France with financial incentives—although several were later assassinated by Venetian agents.

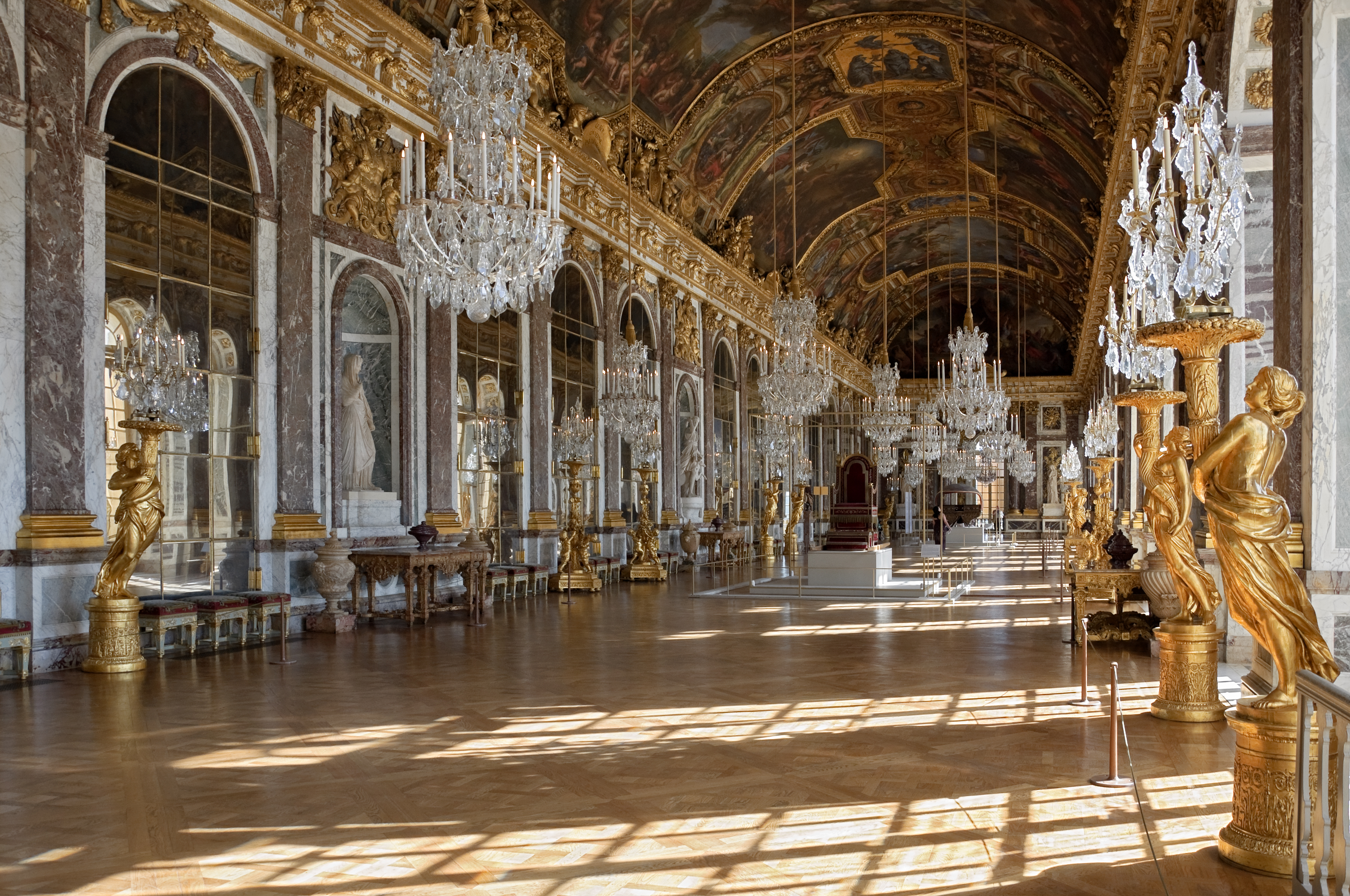
Hall of Mirrors at the Palace of Versailles.

In October 1665, Colbert founded the Royal Mirror Glass Manufacture and appointed financier Nicolas du Noyer, general tax collector in Orléans, as its first director, giving the manufacture the name "Compagnie du Noyer." Nicolas du Noyer and his partners received a 20-year monopoly on the production of glass and mirrors, beginning operations the following year in the Faubourg Saint-Antoine district of Paris. However, the first flawless glass sheets were not produced until 1672. The Hall of Mirrors at the Palace of Versailles, built between 1678 and 1684, spanning 73 meters and adorned with 357 mirrors, demonstrated the manufacturing prowess of the Royal Mirror Glass Manufacture. In 1692, the company relocated to the former Château of the Lords of Coucy in Saint-Gobain, as the new production process required large quantities of wood, which were abundantly available in the Retz Forest, then managed primarily to supply wood for Paris. That same year, the manufacture was renamed the Compagnie Plastrier.

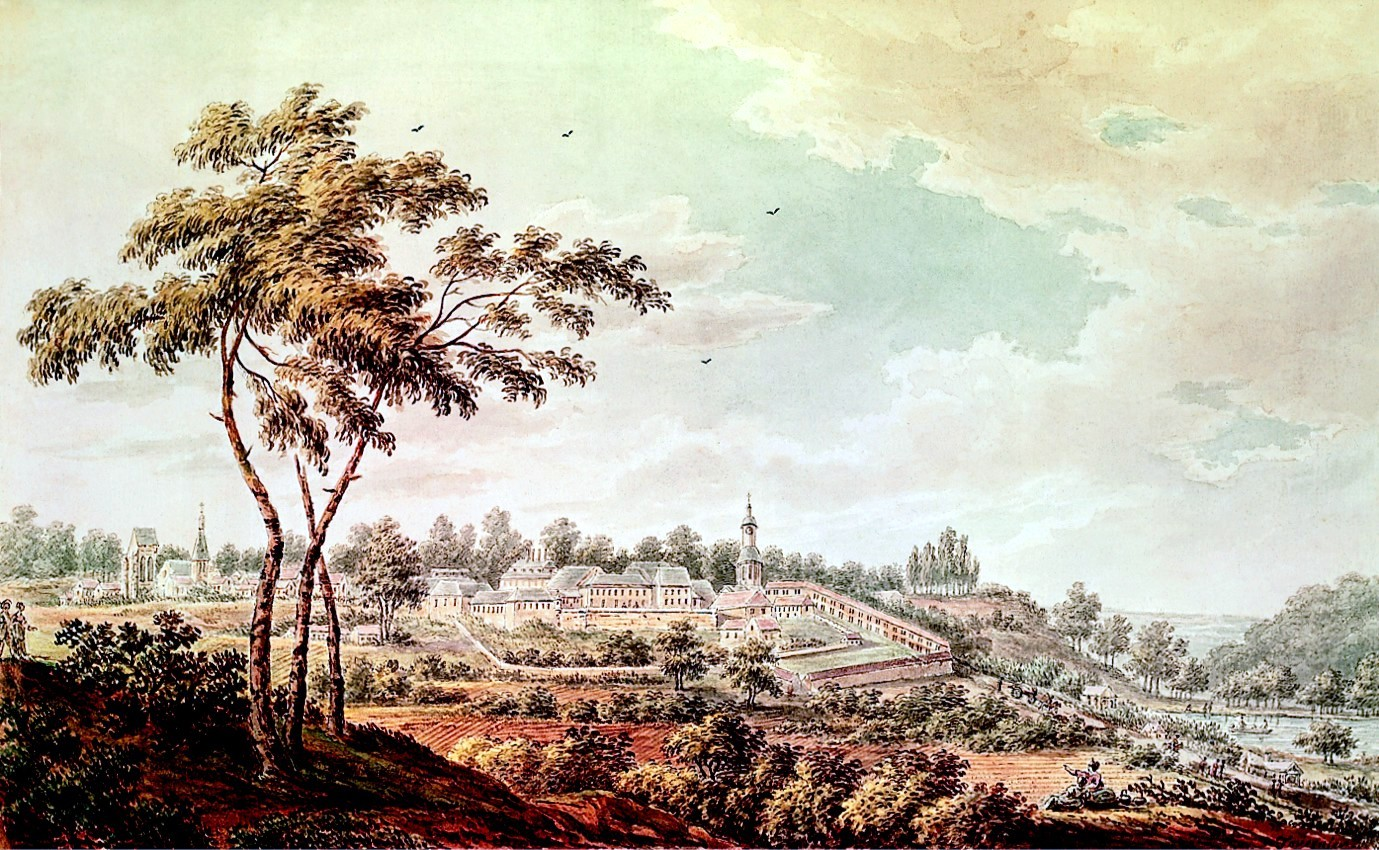
Village of Saint-Gobain in the 18th century, origin unknown.

At the end of the 18th century, the Saint-Gobain site alone employed between 2,000 and 3,000 workers, but the French Revolution led to the abolition of the manufacture's monopoly, causing the international market to collapse. It was not until 1830 that its activities resulted in the creation of the Saint-Gobain company, which in 1858 absorbed its main competitor, the Saint-Quirin glassworks, and became publicly traded in 1902.

Still operating in 2015 with more than 170,000 employees, Saint-Gobain is the oldest company listed on the CAC 40 and a major historical legacy of Colbert. However, its historical premises in the town of Saint-Gobain are no longer used by the company and have since been repurposed for the manufacture of carousels.

===== La Glacerie =====
Glass manufacturing in the village of La Glacerie dates back to the early 16th century, with King Francis I granting a royal privilege to the Belleville family in 1540. The site benefited from its natural surroundings: a large supply of wood from the Brix Forest, the Trottebec River to power mills, and seaweed for producing soda ash, an essential ingredient in glassmaking. Additionally, its geographic position provided a double advantage: proximity to the port of Cherbourg for shipping products via sea and river transport and seclusion to protect manufacturing secrets.

Starting in 1655, the glassworks were managed by Richard Lucas de Néhou, who modernized it by diversifying production to include crystals, window glass, and spectacle lenses. He partnered with Colbert to make the factory a subcontractor for the Royal Mirror Glass Manufacture. In 1667, the La Glacerie factory was officially integrated into the royal manufacture, contributing to the production of mirrors for the Hall of Mirrors at the Palace of Versailles. The factory produced the glass, which was then polished in Parisian workshops. Closed in 1834, the La Glacerie factory was later converted into a museum but was destroyed by Allied bombings in Normandy in 1944.

===== Glass and mirror manufactures of Saint-Quirin, Cirey, and Monthermé =====
The glass and mirror manufactures of Saint-Quirin, Cirey, and Monthermé consisted of three factories built between 1737 and 1762 in these villages in Champagne. The Saint-Quirin glassworks was granted the title of "Royal Manufacture" by Louis XV in 1755, adopting the name "Royal Manufacture of Crystals and Table Glass." The three establishments merged in 1766, becoming a major competitor to the Royal Mirror Glass Manufacture for a century. Eventually, the two companies merged in 1858.

==== Lorraine crystalworks ====
The Compagnie des Cristalleries de Saint-Louis was founded in 1586 in the Münzthal Valley, making it France's oldest crystal manufacturer. Specializing in decorative arts, tableware, lighting, and furniture, it has been owned by Hermès since 1994. The Portieux crystalworks was established in Lorraine around 1690. It was granted royal status in 1767, the year after Lorraine was annexed to France. Currently, it is a subsidiary of the Paris-based company The Pretty Kaolin Ceramics.

The Baccarat crystalworks was founded in 1764 by Bishop Louis-Joseph de Montmorency-Laval of Metz, under permission from King Louis XV. Production included window panes, mercury-silvered mirrors, and glassware. After a period of rapid growth, the manufacture struggled economically after the French Revolution, eventually going bankrupt in 1806. It was later revived and modernized following its purchase in 1820 by industrialist Aimé-Gabriel d'Artigues, then in 1822 by three associates, including businessman Pierre Antoine Godard-Desmarest. The factory experienced renewed growth during the Industrial Revolution. Still in operation today, the Baccarat crystalworks employed 650 workers in 2018.

=== Steel industries ===
==== Weapons manufacturing ====
During the 17th and 18th centuries, the numerous wars involving the Kingdom of France necessitated the establishment of weapons factories, which gained international fame after supplying firearms to the American revolutionaries during the American Revolutionary War.

===== Charleville weapons manufacture =====
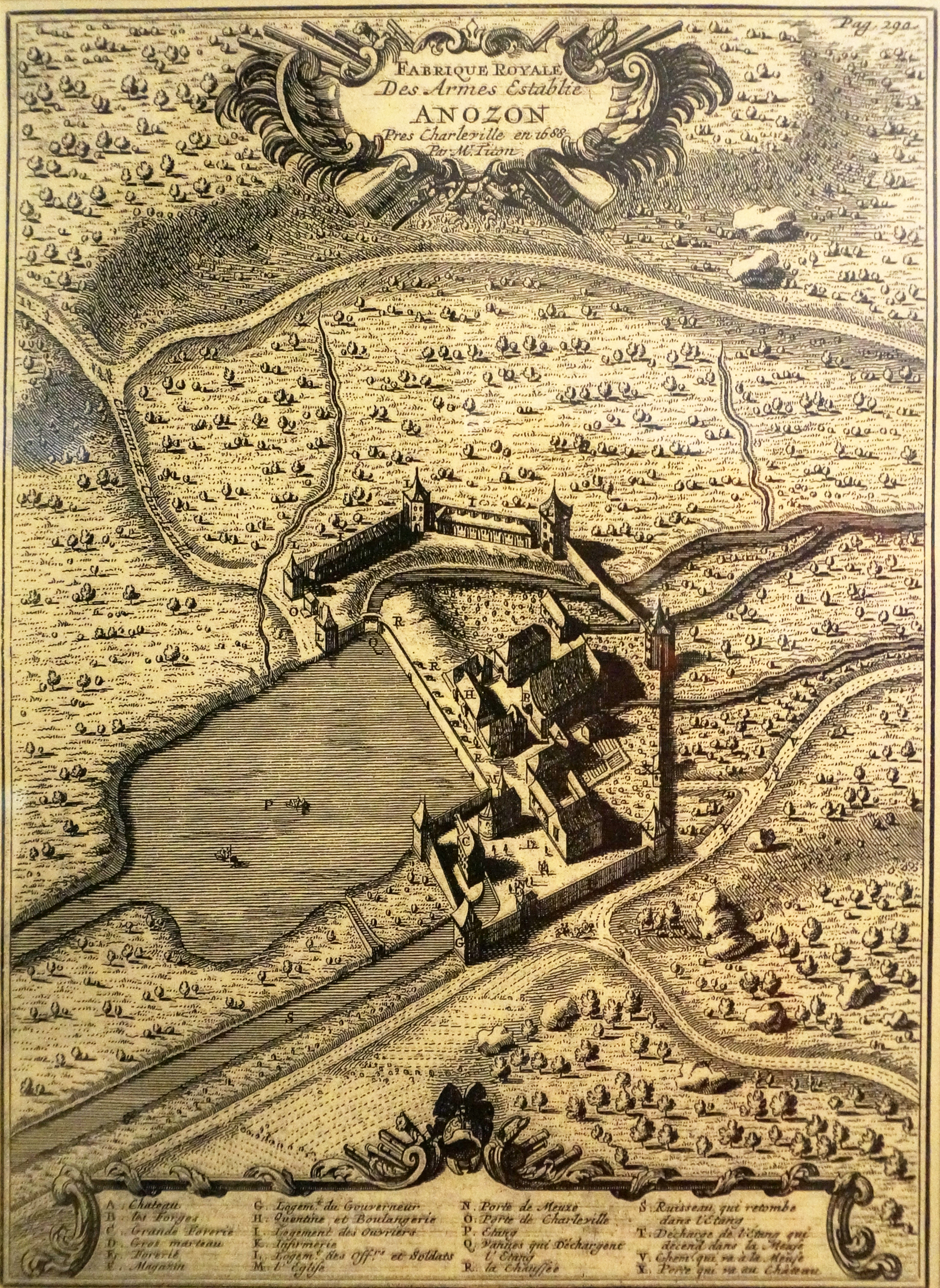
Engraving of the Nouzonville forge, Musée de l'Ardenne, date unknown.

The Charleville weapons manufacture was established in 1675 by Maximilien Titon, Director-General of Royal Arms Manufactures and Warehouses, along with merchant Toussaint Fournier. In 1688, the city was granted the title of Royal Manufacture, along with a warehouse on Rue de Nevers, managed by Victor Fournier, which then became an exclusive supplier of firearms to the king. Firearms were assembled in Charleville using parts produced in two other main sites: Nouzonville, located on the Goutelle River, and Mohon, as well as in numerous small artisanal workshops scattered throughout the Meuse and Semois valleys. In 1717, Peter the Great, Tsar of Russia, visited the Charleville arms factory on his way back from Paris, where he had met Louis XV.

At the end of the 18th century, the Charleville musket, designed by engineer Gribeauval, was produced. This firearm became widely known for its massive use on European battlefields (French Revolution, War in the Vendée, Napoleonic Wars) as well as in America (United States War of Independence). The Charleville manufacture was shut down in 1836, as it was deemed too close to the borders established in 1815 by the Congress of Vienna following Napoleon I's defeat. This closure triggered an economic crisis in the region but benefited another former royal manufacture, the Saint-Étienne arms factory.

===== Alsace edged weapons manufacture =====
The Alsace Edged Weapons Manufacture was established in 1730 by order of Louis XV. It was the first of its kind in France, where edged weapons had previously been crafted by local blacksmiths and sword makers. The Ehn Valley, upstream from Obernai, was chosen as the site due to the river's energy production, as well as the abundant raw materials needed for the factory's construction and operation (wood, sandstone). Additionally, the Rhine River's proximity facilitated steel imports from Siegen and the distribution of weapons via Strasbourg's arsenal. The Alsatian dialect, commonly spoken in the region, also helped the first workers from Solingen integrate more easily.

The village of Klingenthal was built from scratch around the manufacture in 1730. By the mid-19th century, Alsace was seen as a vulnerable region (it was eventually annexed by Germany in 1870), leading to the relocation of the manufacture to Châtellerault, near Poitiers. In the 1990s, a museum was opened in the original Klingenthal buildings.

===== Saint-Étienne weapons manufacture =====
The Saint-Étienne Royal Arms Manufacture was founded in 1764 with the approval of Louis XV and under the direction of M. de Montbéliard, an inspector of the Charleville manufacture. The title of "Royal Manufacture," granted in the late 18th century, allowed it to become the official supplier of French and foreign troops. However, it was not an industrial facility in the modern sense but rather an administrative grouping of nine existing workshops.

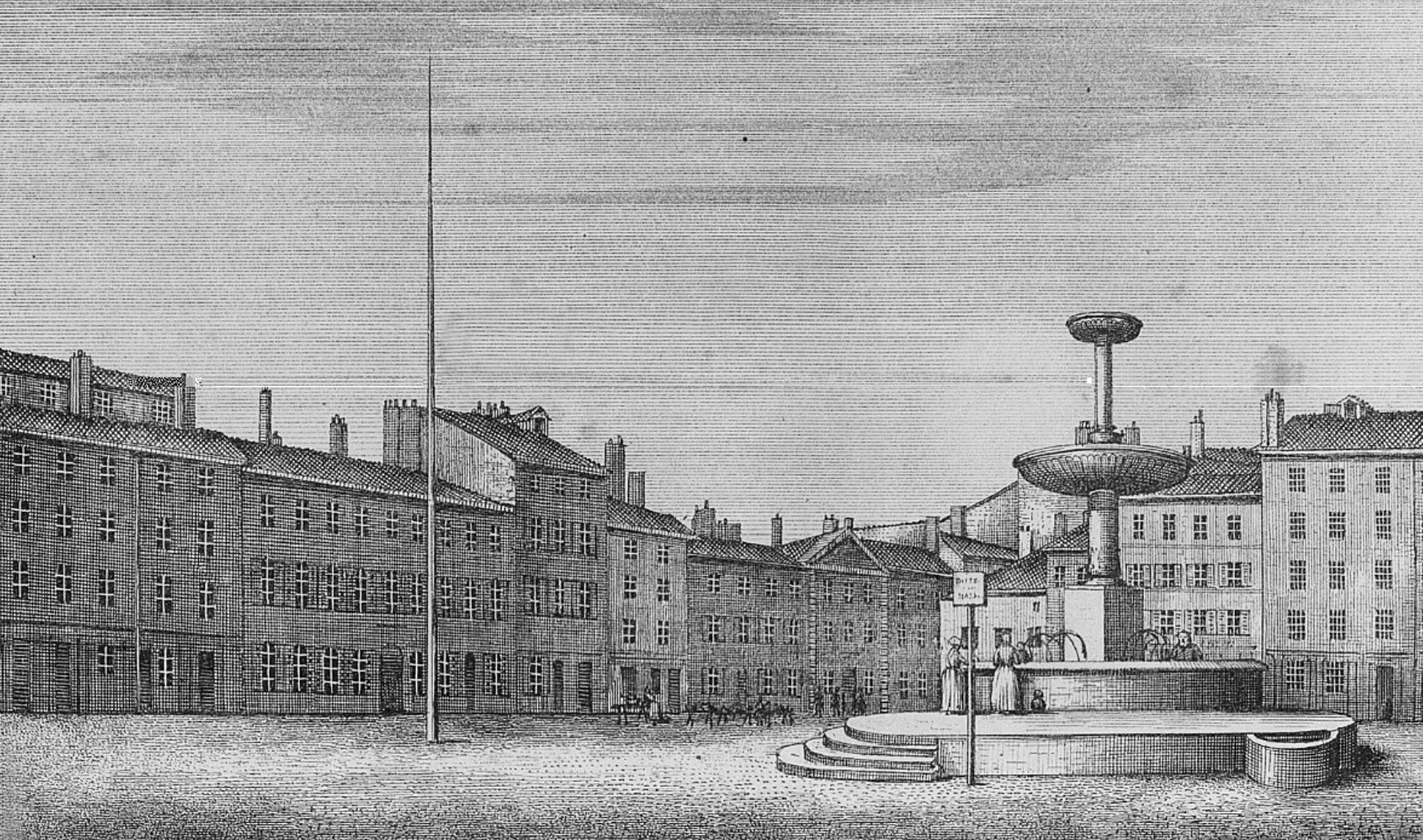
Headquarters of the Saint-Étienne arms factory in 1764, engraving from 1856.

Starting in 1775, during the American War of Independence, Louis XVI used this manufacture to support the American insurgents, in collaboration with poet Pierre-Augustin Caron de Beaumarchais and shipowner Jean Peltier Dudoyer from Nantes.

In 1864, a century after receiving its royal title, the Saint-Étienne arms manufacture was transformed into a fully operational factory, covering 12 hectares. The closures of the Charleville and Klingenthal manufactures significantly increased its production. Its workforce grew from 10,000 workers in 1890 to 16,000 during World War I. However, after World War II, the factory suffered a severe decline and eventually closed in 1990.

===== Tulle weapons manufacture =====
The Tulle arms manufacture was founded in 1690 by Martial Fénis de Lacombe, King's Prosecutor at the Presidial Court of Tulle. It was officially granted royal recognition in 1777.

==== Other steel industries ====
===== Royal company of mines and Foundries of Languedoc =====
The Royal Company of Mines and Foundries of Languedoc was founded in 1666 to exploit lead and copper deposits in the province, as well as those in Rouergue and Foix, and to establish foundries to refine the ore. The Company sought Colbert's support to bring miners from Sweden experienced in finding copper and lead veins, as well as ore processing, and sent engineers to Germany to study the mining systems of the Harz and Saxony regions. However, the knowledge transfer operation failed, and the project was abandoned in 1670.

===== Royal tinplate manufacture of Bains-les-Bains =====
The Royal Tinplate Manufacture of Bains-les-Bains in Lorraine was established in 1733 through a patent letter from Duchess Élisabeth Charlotte, granddaughter of King Louis XIII and wife of Duke Leopold I of Lorraine. In the 19th century, the site was converted into a horse nail factory, before ceasing operations in 1950. In the 2000s, the site was privatized and turned into a gîte.

=== Ceramic manufacturing ===
The techniques for manufacturing faience were known in France at the beginning of the 16th century, after developing in Spain and Northern Italy. Ceramists Masséot Abaquesne and Bernard Palissy were pioneers in France and significantly contributed to introducing this craft under the reign of Francis I. The faience of Rouen, founded by Masséot Abaquesne, was one of the oldest in the kingdom but ceased operations after its founder's death in 1564, only to be revived a century later by Regent Anne of Austria.

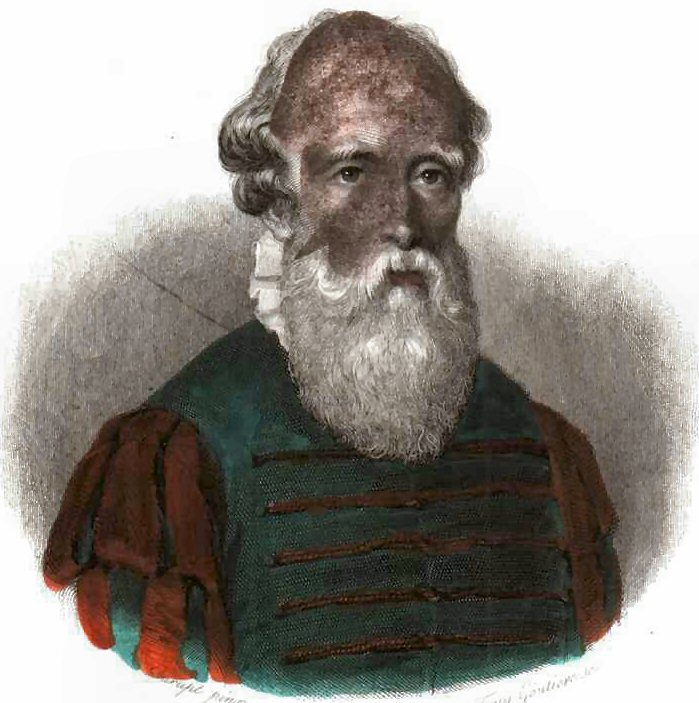
Bernard Palissy (1501–1590), pioneer of ceramic craftsmanship in the Kingdom of France.

The 17th and 18th centuries were marked by a rapid increase in the number of faience manufactories in France, driven by several factors. On the one hand, Louis XIV's foreign policy, aimed at financing his wars against foreign powers, required the melting down of all gold and silver objects and furniture in the kingdom. This decision directly impacted the noble families' tableware, leading them to turn to faience. On the other hand, France's economic boom allowed the bourgeoisie to become a new clientele for faience. Additionally, in the second half of the 18th century, the discovery of kaolinite, a white clay used in porcelain production, further contributed to the growth of this industry. Benefiting from these favorable circumstances, many private companies were founded alongside the royal manufactories: in Marseille (from 1677) and Varages nearby (1695), in Quimper (1708), in Strasbourg (1721), in Angoulême (1731), in Bourg-la-Reine (1735), in Malicorne in Sarthe (1747), in Martres-Tolosane in Languedoc (1748), in Desvres in the North (1748), and Moustiers in the Alps (1749).

The faience of Niderviller, while not receiving the title of Royal Manufacture, was one of the main faience factories in the kingdom when it was founded in 1730. The Lorraine village of Niderviller was attached to it before the Duchy of Lorraine by the Treaty of Vincennes in 1661, and it remains one of the last active faience factories in France, purchased in 1993 by the group "Les Jolies Céramiques sans Kaolin." Except for Rouen faience, Colbert was relatively uninvolved in the development of this sector in France, most of whose growth occurred after he died in 1683.

==== Rouen faience ====
The faïence of Rouen was founded in the 16th century by Masséot Abaquesne, who created pharmacy and grocery containers with Italian influences. His masterpiece is a series of tiles produced between 1540 and 1548 to decorate Château d'Écouen, now the National Renaissance Museum. The enterprise ceased operations after the death of its founder in 1564.

It was revived in 1644 thanks to a 50-year monopoly granted by Regent Anne of Austria to entrepreneurs Nicolas Poirel and Edme Poterat, becoming a Royal Manufacture. In the 1660s, Colbert supported the workshop with an order for tiles for the Trianon of Porcelain. In 1673, Louis Poterat, Edme's son, obtained royal permission to manufacture soft porcelain. Later, with the end of the Poterat monopoly, numerous competing factories opened (at its peak, Rouen had 22 factories), employing hundreds of workers. This growth was followed by a decline in the second half of the 18th century due to increasing competition, and by the end of the century, most of these factories ceased operations (including Edme Poterat's factory in 1795).

==== Bordeaux faience ====
On November 13, 1714, Jacques Hustin, the treasurer of the Bordeaux navy, obtained patent letters with an exclusive privilege for the production and marketing of stanniferous faience within a 10-league radius. Thanks to this royal privilege, which was renewed until 1762, he held the monopoly on faience production in his Bordeaux workshops.

In the 19th century, the Bordeaux faience factories were consolidated into the David Johnston Manufacture, an entrepreneur of Irish origin and Mayor of Bordeaux from 1838 to 1842. This manufacture was later acquired in 1845 by Jules Vieillard under the name "J. Vieillard & Cie", employing 1,300 workers in 1870, but ultimately ceased operations in 1895.

==== Vincennes-Sèvres manufacture ====
The Vincennes manufacture, dedicated to producing soft porcelain, was established with the support of Louis XV in 1740 within the Vincennes Castle grounds, then transferred in 1756 to Sèvres to form the Sèvres Manufacture. The manufacture was attached to the Crown in 1759, and hard porcelain was commercialized at Sèvres starting in 1770.

From 1800 to 1847, the manufacture flourished and gained international renown under the leadership of Alexandre Brongniart, a mineralogist and geologist appointed by Claude Berthollet. In 1875, the manufacturer was relocated to specially built buildings by the French state, on the edge of Saint-Cloud Park, and it continues to operate in these historically protected sites, employing 120 official ceramists.

==== Limoges porcelain ====
In 1767, a kaolin deposit, white clay used in porcelain manufacturing, was discovered in Saint-Yrieix-la-Perche, near Limoges. The deposit was purchased by Louis XV in 1769, making porcelain production a royal privilege. The first Limoges porcelain factory was founded in 1771 and came under the protection of Count of Artois in 1774.

Throughout the 19th century, many factories were created in the Haute-Vienne, either near the forests (such as Saint-Léonard-de-Noblat, Sauviat-sur-Vige, and Rochechouart) or along rivers, or close to kaolin quarries (in Saint-Yrieix and Coussac-Bonneval), with industrialists like François Alluaud, who innovated and improved manufacturing processes, and the American David Haviland.

During the second half of the 19th century, the American market absorbed up to three-quarters of the value of production, and to meet demand, production became concentrated in Limoges. The Casseaux kiln, built in 1884, was used until 1959, and it is now preserved by the city of Limoges as a symbol of the city's porcelain tradition. The kiln has been listed as a historical monument since July 6, 1987.

==== Lunéville-Saint-Clément pottery ====
The Lunéville and Saint-Clément earthenware factories were founded in 1730 and 1758 by Jacques Chambrette, who entrusted the management of the Saint-Clément factory to his son Gabriel. Like the tinplate factory in Bains-les-Bains, the Lunéville factory became "royal" by the decision of Duchess Élisabeth Charlotte, who granted it tax exemptions. The Saint-Clément factory was officially authorized by Louis XV in 1758, located 7 km from Lunéville but on the territory of the Bishopric of Metz, allowing the Chambrette family to trade with the Kingdom of France without paying customs duties.

The Saint-Clément site was purchased in 1763 by sculptor Paul-Louis Cyfflé and royal architect Richard Mique, who also obtained public orders for their earthenware. The two sites were merged in 1892 to form the Lunéville-Saint-Clément earthenware factory, which remains in operation and is currently owned by the company Les Jolies Céramiques sans kaolin.

=== Other manufactured products ===
==== Waxes and candles ====
The Antony factory for wax bleaching and candle making, known as the Royal Wax Factory, was founded in 1702 in Antony (south of Paris) by Brice Péan de Saint-Gilles and was acquired in 1737 by the Trudon family, active since 1643 also in Antony. Initially founded to supply candles to the Palace of Versailles, churches, and other royal castles, the company "Trudon," still in business today and currently based in Paris, now largely exports its products.

In March 2020, the buildings of the former factory were sold to a property developer by the Congregation of the Sisters of Saint Joseph of Cluny, which had owned the site since 1890. Historian and heritage defender Stéphane Bern, informed of plans to destroy part of the site to build housing, intervened with local officials to halt the project and preserve the historic factory. The mayor of Antony, Jean-Yves Sénant, responded positively, stating the city's intent to purchase and restore the site as a cultural venue.

The Royal Wax Factory of Dugny, specializing in the production of wax, candles, tapers, and torches, was granted the title of royal factory in 1774. It participated in the Industrial Revolution by being one of the first French factories to use steam engines for pressing candles.

==== Tobacco industry ====
In 1674, Colbert established a state monopoly on tobacco products and granted royal privileges to the tobacco operations in Morlaix, Dieppe, and Paris. These were managed by the General Farm, founded in 1680 by Louis XIV on Colbert's recommendation, with the mission of handling indirect tax collection, customs duties, stamp acts, and domain products.

In 1724, the French East India Company, founded by Colbert in 1664, established a tobacco factory in Le Havre, initially set up in an old handball court and later constructed in 1726 by engineers Jean-Jacques Martinet and Jacques III Jules Gabriel. Active until the early 20th century, it was destroyed in 1944 by Allied bombings in Normandy.

The Morlaix factory was built starting in 1736 by Jean-François Blondel, architect of the Royal Academy of Architecture, and employed nearly 1,800 workers in the 19th century. Active until the mid-20th century, the building was classified as a historical monument in 1997 and became a branch of the Espace des sciences in Rennes in 2020. The royal tobacco monopoly was abolished by the French Revolution in 1789, but other public monopolies on tobacco were established by the regimes that succeeded the Ancien Régime.

== Assessment and impacts on the industrialization of France ==
=== Economic assessment of colbertism ===
While Jean-Baptiste Colbert undeniably left his mark on French history with his determination to advance the country's economic development under Louis XIV, contemporary economists and historians are somewhat divided in evaluating his legacy.

==== Successes of colbertism ====
Regarding the successes of Colbert's economic policies, historians and economists highlight:

- His management of France's foreign trade, which saw the balance of trade, become highly favorable during his tenure.
- The modernization of the state's legal tools to regulate the kingdom's economy, such as the creation of the Forest Code (from which the current Code forestier comes), the Maritime Code, the Commerce Code (the "Savary Code"), and the Black Code regulating the status and condition of slaves in the colonies.
- The creation of several French colonial companies and a powerful navy to import raw materials and export finished products, although these companies were much less successful than their English and Dutch counterparts.
- An effective transfer of skills, such as Dutch textile artisans brought in to develop the Gobelins factory, and Venetian glassmakers hired to establish the Royal Mirror Glass Factory. In addition to workers, great intellectuals like César-François Cassini, Christian Huygens, and Gottfried Wilhelm Leibniz settled in France, some of whom worked for the Academy of Sciences.
- The development of transport infrastructure, like canals, helped unify the kingdom, and several ports. New cities were also created around certain factories, such as La Glacerie and Klingenthal.
- Finally, the state's support for the creation of businesses through financial aid and protectionist measures helped several of them reach a critical size that favored their longevity, as evidenced by royal factories still in operation today, such as Saint-Gobain (formerly the Royal Mirror Glass Factory), Balsan (formerly the Châteauroux cloth factory), and Baccarat.

==== Limitations of colbertism ====
Colbert has been criticized by historians and proponents of economic liberalism, who accuse him of:

- An authoritarian, dirigiste approach to manufacturing, akin to the absolute monarchy he supported, aimed at maintaining order in the kingdom, where labor was intended to discipline and subjugate the population.
- Prioritizing certain sectors focused on "luxury industries," whose production and the jobs created benefited only a minority of the French population, while the majority remained rural and agricultural. Thus, by the time of Louis XIV's death in 1715, France's GDP per capita had grown only 8% over the century, whereas that of the English had increased by 28%, and that of the Dutch by 54%.
- An economic pursuit primarily aimed at increasing the kingdom's tax base to support the king's military campaigns and lavish constructions such as the Palace of Versailles.
- Excessive protectionism justified by the search for a trade surplus, which led to the prohibition of importing "Indian" fabrics by the Marquis de Louvois in 1685, even though France did not produce any comparable fabrics, at least until the creation of the Oberkampf factory in 1760. This prohibition mainly resulted in an increase in smuggling in the short term.
- The regulations and monopolies granted simultaneously prevented business projects within France (since they were prohibited in regulated sectors), which weakened France in favor of the Netherlands, Great Britain, and the Italian republics.
- Another effect of this excessive protectionism was that it discouraged innovation among industrial actors benefiting from state-granted monopolies and reinforced "technical conservatism."

=== Fate of the Royal Manufactures during the Industrial Revolution ===
At the start of the French Revolution, the new power rushed to "liberate market forces" by abolishing corporations (Allarde decree, 1791) and banning any coalitions (Le Chapelier law, 1791). This legislation established the freedom of trade and industry, which became the foundation of economic liberalism in France. The bourgeoisie, the triumphant class of the Revolution, became the main driving force behind the industrialization of France, as it now had the most significant financial resources.

Several former royal manufactures thrived and modernized in the 19th century as private enterprises, such as the Oberkampf factory (which became royal 20 years after its founding in 1760), the Le Dijonval cloth factory, the Rames factory, and most of the glass and ceramics factories. The Charleville and Klingenthal armaments factories, deemed too vulnerable due to their proximity to the Eastern border, were closed or relocated, benefiting the nationalized Saint-Étienne armaments factory in 1838, which was modernized with steam engines in 1864. In 1858, the Saint-Gobain factories merged with the Saint-Quirin, Cirey, and Monthermé glass and mirror factories and went public in 1902, making it the oldest company on the CAC 40 index.

Although the economic system was now liberal, the state financially invested in territorial development (like Colbert, who developed river and port infrastructures) to promote economic growth. The Guizot law (1842) and the Freycinet Plan (1879–1882) favored the expansion of the railway system across the country, while Baron Haussmann carried out large-scale transformations of Paris under the Second Empire (1853–1870). Another occasional persistence of Colbertist policies was the introduction of protectionist measures during unfavorable economic conditions, such as the Méline tariff of 1892, which created a dual customs tariff.

The French colonial empire, largely established and organized by Richelieu and Colbert, also contributed to supporting industrialization by supplying raw materials to the mainland, primarily from the Caribbean, such as cotton, sugar, tobacco, and wood.

=== "Colbertism" under the Fifth Republic ===
==== High-tech colbertism ====
In 1992, French economist Élie Cohen published an essay analyzing, among other things, France's industrial successes during the Thirty Glorious Years in the export sectors of capital goods, with state support. He defined "high-tech Colbertism" as a combination of public initiative in research, off-market financing, and public orders in service of companies and industries promoted as "attributes of sovereignty." While he focused on the telecommunications sector (the General Telecommunications Directorate and Minitel), he also mentioned other industrial successes resulting from collaboration between the public and private sectors, particularly in transportation (Ariane, Airbus, or the TGV), energy (the Framatome nuclear sector, later Areva), and oil technologies (Coflexip, Technip).

==== The "New Industrial France" ====
In 2013, the French government launched a major reindustrialization project for France titled "34 Plans for a New Industrial France," led by President François Hollande and Minister for Productive Recovery Arnaud Montebourg. Among the 34 plans for reconquest announced by the government were the development of robotics, renewable energy, supercomputers, and the production of autonomous vehicles. "Plan leaders," mostly industrialists, were appointed to organize collective work and collaborative projects and report on the progress of their plan under the predefined roadmaps.

This government-driven initiative to foster the growth of certain sectors considered strategic is seen by some economists as a "resurrection of Colbertism," especially since it includes sectors already considered strategic in the 18th century, such as textiles and the timber industry. In his autobiography, published in 2020, Arnaud Montebourg gives particularly high praise to Colbert and states that he regularly drew inspiration from his industrial development plans under the Ancien Régime to revive the French industry at the start of the 21st century.

== See also ==
- Colbertism
- Mercantilism
- Infant industry argument
- Letters patent
- Monument historique

== Bibliography ==
=== Books ===
- Diderot, Denis; Le Rond d'Alembert, Jean (1751–1772). Encyclopédie ou Dictionnaire raisonné des sciences, des arts et des métiers (in French). André Le Breton.
- Fagniez, Gustave (1883). L'Industrie en France sous Henri IV (1589–1610) [Industry in France under Henry IV (1589–1610)] (in French). Revue historique.
- Fagniez, Gustave (1897). L'Économie sociale de la France sous Henri IV (1589–1610) [The Social Economy of France under Henry IV (1589–1610)] (in French). Hachette. pp. 101–162.
- Weber, Max (1905). L'Éthique protestante et l'esprit du capitalisme [The Protestant Ethic and the Spirit of Capitalism] (in French). Édition Plon.
- Markovitch, Tihomir J (1976). Les Industries lainières de Colbert à la Révolution [Colbert's wool industry during the Revolution] (in French). Librairie Droz. pp. 244–271. ISBN 978-2-600-04075-4.
- Cohen, Élie (1992). Le colbertisme high-tech. Économie des Télécom et du grand projet [High-tech Colbertism. The economics of Telecom and major projects] (in French). Hachette Livre. pp. 14–18 & 108–112.
- Teisseyre-Sallmann, Line (1995). L'Industrie de la soie en Bas-Languedoc : XVIIe – XVIIIe siècles [The silk industry in Bas-Languedoc: 17th – 18th centuries] (in French). École nationale des chartes. p. 25. ISBN 978-2-900791-12-7.
- Bergeron, Louis (1999). "Chapitre IX. l'Entreprise Oberkampf". Banquiers, négociants et manufacturiers parisiens du Directoire à l'Empire [Parisian bankers, traders and manufacturers from the Directory to the Empire]. Les ré-impressions (in French). School for Advanced Studies in the Social Sciences. pp. 223–265. ISBN 978-2-7132-2552-9.
- Attali, Jacques (2006). Une brève histoire de l'avenir [A Brief History of the Future] (in French). Fayard. pp. 81–95.
- Mortal, Patrick (2007). "– 1 – de la fabrique à la manufacture royale". Les armuriers L'État, Du Grand Siècle à la globalisation 1665-1989 [The Gunsmiths The State, From the Grand Siècle to Globalization 1665-1989]. Histoire et civilisations (in French). Presses universitaires du Septentrion. pp. 19–45. ISBN 978-2-7574-2276-2.
- d'Aubert, François (2014). "Colbert, La vertu usurpée" [Colbert, The Usurped Virtue]. Tempus (in French). Éditions Perrin: 365–392.
- Piketty, Thomas (2019). Capital et Idéologie [Capital and Ideology] (in French). Éditions du Seuil. pp. 159–192 & 247–301.
- Montebourg, Arnaud (2020). L'Engagement [The Commitment] (in French). Éditions Grasset. pp. 129–147.

=== Scientific articles ===
- Boissonnade, Prosper (1902). "Colbert, son système et les entreprises industrielles en Languedoc (1661–1683)" [Colbert, his system and the industrial companies in Languedoc (1661–1683)]. Annales du Midi (in French): 46. Archived from the original on January 20, 2022.
- Dutil, Léon (1908). "L'industrie de la soie à Nîmes jusqu'en 1789" [The silk industry in Nîmes until 1789]. Revue d'histoire moderne et contemporaine (in French): 25. Archived from the original on January 3, 2022.
- Pinsseau, Pierre (1944). "Le canal Henri IV ou canal de Briare (1604–1943). Orléans, Houzé" [The Henri IV canal or Briare canal (1604–1943). Orléans, Houzé]. Bibliothèque de l'École des chartes (in French): 25. Archived from the original on January 3, 2022.
- Fohlen, Claude (1949). "En Languedoc : vigne contre draperie" [In Languedoc: vineyards for cloth factories]. Annales (in French): 7. Archived from the original on January 3, 2022.
- Hossard, Jean (1953). "Abaquesne, premier faïencier français au service de la pharmacie" [Abaquesne, the first French earthenware manufacturer to serve the pharmaceutical industry]. Revue d'histoire de la pharmacie (in French): 4. Archived from the original on January 3, 2022.
- Daumas, Maurice; Tresse, René (1954). "La Description des Arts et Métiers de l'Académie des Sciences et le sort de ses planches gravées en taille douce" [The Description des Arts et Métiers of the Académie des Sciences and the fate of its engraved plates]. Revue d'histoire des sciences (in French). 7 (2): 8. Archived from the original on January 3, 2022.
- Le Blant, Robert (1955). "La Compagnie de la Nouvelle-France et la restitution de l'Acadie (1627–1636)" [The Compagnie de la Nouvelle-France and the restoration of Acadia (1627–1636)]. Outre-Mers. Revue d'histoire (in French): 14. Archived from the original on January 3, 2022.
- Pris, Claude; Marquant, Robert (1977). "La Manufacture royale des glaces de Saint-Gobain, 1665-1830. Une grande entreprise sous l'Ancien Régime" [The Saint-Gobain Royal Mirror Factory, 1665-1830. A large company under the Ancien Régime]. Bibliothèque de l'École des chartes (in French): 6. Archived from the original on January 3, 2022.
- Mendels, Franklin (1984). "Des industries rurales à la protoindustrialisation : historique d'un changement de perspective" [From rural industries to proto-industrialization: the story of a change of perspective]. Annales (in French): 31. Archived from the original on January 3, 2022.
- Guery, Alain (1989). "Industrie et Colbertisme ; origines de la forme française de la politique industrielle" [Industry and Colbertism; origins of the French form of industrial policy]. Histoire, économie & société (in French): 15. Archived from the original on January 3, 2022.
- Bouet, Guy; Balabanian, Olivier (1994). "La porcelaine de Limoges" [Limoges porcelain]. Norois (in French). 164 (1): 5. doi:10.3406/noroi.1994.6599. Archived from the original on January 3, 2022.
- Buti, Gilbert (2008). "Des goûts et des couleurs : Draps du Languedoc pour clientèle levantine au XVIIIe siècle" [Different strokes: Languedoc sheets for Levantine clientele in the 18th century]. Rives méditerranéennes (in French) (29): 15. Archived from the original on May 29, 2022.
- Hocquet, Jean-Claude (2011). "L'arsenal de Venise. Créations, modernisations, survie d'une grande structure industrielle" [The arsenal of Venice. Creation, modernization, survival of a large industrial structure]. Rives méditerranéennes (in French). 253 (4): 627–638. doi:10.3917/dss.114.0627. Archived from the original on April 5, 2022.
- Margoline-Plot, Eugénie (2011). "Les circuits parallèles des toiles de l'océan Indien" [The parallel circuits of the Indian Ocean's surface currents]. Société française d'histoire urbaine (in French). 30 (1): 109–125. doi:10.3917/rhu.030.0109.
- Borello, Céline (2018). "Droit naturel, intolérance et tolérance à l'égard des huguenots au XVIIIe siècle" [Natural law, intolerance and tolerance towards the Huguenots in the 18th century]. Annales de Bretagne et des pays de l'Ouest (in French). 125–1: 71–82. doi:10.4000/abpo.3773. Archived from the original on January 3, 2022.

=== Encyclopedic sources ===
- Tudesq, André Jean (29 January 2025). "Christophe-Philippe Oberkampf". Encyclopædia Universalis (in French). p. 1.
- Etner, François (29 January 2025). "Mercantilisme" [Commercialism]. Encyclopædia Universalis (in French). p. 1.
- Brossollet, Jacqueline (29 January 2025). "René-Antoine Ferchault de Réaumur". Encyclopædia Universalis (in French). p. 1.
- Imbert, Jean (29 January 2025). "Colbertisme, Une politique commerciale" [Colbertism, A trade policy]. Encyclopædia Universalis (in French). p. 1.
- Constant, Jean-Marie (29 January 2025). "Manufacture d'armes de Saint-Étienne" [Saint-Étienne arms factory]. Encyclopædia Universalis (in French). p. 1.
- Reynies, Nicole (29 January 2025). "Manufacture d'Aubusson" [Aubusson Manufactory]. Encyclopædia Universalis (in French). p. 1.
- Collomb, Olivier (29 January 2025). "Josse Van Robais". Encyclopædia Universalis (in French). p. 1.

=== Press and popularization ===
- "Hermès prend le contrôle de Saint-Louis et de Puiforcat" [Hermès takes control of Saint-Louis and Puiforcat]. Les Echos (in French). 1994. p. 1. Archived from the original on December 14, 2019.
- Nourrisson, Didier (2003). "Le tabac, le fisc et le buraliste" [Tobacco, the taxman and the tobacconist]. L'Histoire (in French). p. 1. Archived from the original on July 16, 2018.
- "1699, décadence de la manufacture des Saptes" [1699, decline of the Saptes factory]. La Dépêche du Midi (in French). 2004. p. 1. Archived from the original on March 4, 2016.
- Marseille, Jacques (2007). "La faute à Colbert ?" [Colbert to blame?]. Les Echos (in French). p. 2. Archived from the original on July 18, 2017.
- "Des traditions françaises distinguées par l'Unesco" [French traditions honored by UNESCO]. La Croix (in French). 2010. p. 1. ISSN 0242-6056. Archived from the original on July 18, 2020.
- Solès, Bertrand (2011). "Une manufacture royale de toile à voiles caserne Valence" [A royal sailcloth factory Valence barracks]. La Dépêche du Midi (in French). p. 1. Archived from the original on April 13, 2021.
- Colletis, Gabriel (2013). "On ne peut pas jouer à Colbert en menant une politique d'austérité" [You can't play Colbert and pursue an austerity policy at the same time]. L'Expansion (in French). p. 1. Archived from the original on May 28, 2023.
- Bezbakh, Pierre (2014). "Jules Méline (1838–1925), chantre du protectionnisme" [Jules Méline (1838–1925), champion of protectionism]. Le Monde (in French). p. 1. Archived from the original on August 30, 2014.
- "La nouvelle doctrine de l'État actionnaire, selon Emmanuel Macron" [The new doctrine of the state as shareholder, according to Emmanuel Macron]. L'Usine nouvelle (in French). 2015. p. 1. Archived from the original on April 28, 2017.
- "À la découverte de la maison Trudon, plus vieille manufacture de cire au monde" [Discovering the House of Trudon, the world's oldest wax manufacturer]. France Info (in French). 2015. p. 1. Archived from the original on October 7, 2017.
- "Décret d'Allarde, Loi Le Chapelier, textes libéraux ?" [Decree of Allarde, Law of Le Chapelier, liberal texts?]. Contrepoints (in French). 2015. p. 1. Archived from the original on March 7, 2018.
- Pean, Laurence (2015). "Christophe-Philippe Oberkampf, le maître de la toile de Jouy" [Christophe-Philippe Oberkampf, the master of Toile de Jouy]. La Croix (in French). p. 1. Archived from the original on January 3, 2022.
- Preveraud, Jean-Franois (2015). "Saint-Gobain : innovateur depuis 350 ans !" [Saint-Gobain: innovating for 350 years!]. Industrie et Technologies (in French). p. 2. Archived from the original on January 3, 2022.
- "De la manufacture d'armes stéphanoise aux bateaux de Beaumarchais" [From the arms factory in Saint-Étienne to Beaumarchais' ships]. Le Progrès (in French). 2016. p. 2. Archived from the original on January 3, 2022.
- "La Glacerie : Anéanti en 1944, le musée renaîtra de ses cendres en 1985" [La Glacerie: Destroyed in 1944, the museum rose from the ashes in 1985.]. Ouest-France (in French). 2016. p. 1. Archived from the original on April 19, 2016.
- Ambrosi, Pascal (2016). "Les Cornevaux font revivre la Manufacture de Bains-les-Bains" [The Cornevaux bring the Bains-les-Bains factory back to life]. Les Echos (in French). p. 1. Archived from the original on November 7, 2020.
- Coste, Gérard (February 8, 2018). "L'avant et l'après Gutenberg : la révolution par l'imprimerie" [Before and after Gutenberg: revolution through printing]. Sud Ouest (in French). p. 1. Archived from the original on November 24, 2020.
- Laroche-Signorile, Véronique (April 12, 2018). "Le 13 avril 1598 Henri IV en signant l'édit de Nantes, pacifie la France" [On April 13, 1598, Henri IV signed the Edict of Nantes, bringing peace to France.]. Le Figaro (in French). p. 1. Archived from the original on March 30, 2020.
- "Esclavage : 1642, et la France devint une puissance négrière" [Slavery: 1642, and France became a slave-trading power]. Geo (in French). 2019. p. 1. Archived from the original on June 15, 2020.
- "Cherbourg-en-Cotentin. Le site historique de la Manufacture en voie d'être préservé" [Cherbourg-en-Cotentin. The historic site of the Manufacture is in the process of being preserved]. Ouest-France (in French). April 12, 2019. p. 1. Archived from the original on April 5, 2022.
- Roman-Amat, Béatrice (2019). "Louis XIII (1601–1643), Le précurseur de l'absolutisme" [Louis XIII (1601–1643), the precursor of absolutism]. Herodote.net (in French). p. 1. Archived from the original on January 3, 2022.
- Hammadi, Anissa (March 2, 2020). "Patrimoine : Stéphane Bern au chevet de la manufacture royale des cires d'Antony" [Heritage: Stéphane Bern at the bedside of the Manufacture Royale des Cires d'Antony]. Le Parisien (in French). p. 1.
- Sarmant, Thierry (June 25, 2020). "Colbert et le Code noir: quels sont exactement les faits?" [Colbert and the Code Noir: what exactly are the facts?]. Le Figaro (in French). p. 2.
- "L'histoire des marques ardennaises : le Charleville, fusil emblématique de la guerre d'indépendance américaine" [The history of the Ardennes brands: the Charleville, the iconic rifle of the American War of Independence]. L'Ardennais (in French). 2020. p. 1. Archived from the original on October 20, 2021.
- Hautcoeur, Pierre-Cyrille (October 1, 2020). "Le plan Freycinet de 1879, une autre "relance" française" [The Freycinet plan of 1879, another French "revival"]. Le Monde (in French). p. 1. Archived from the original on April 9, 2021.
- Bouissou, Julien (October 6, 2020). "La traite négrière, oubliée de l'histoire économique" [The slave trade, forgotten in economic history]. Le Monde (in French). p. 2. Archived from the original on February 3, 2021.

=== Ministry of Culture ===
- "Tissage de draps fins, filature de laine dit Manufacture des Rames" [Weaving of fine sheets, wool spinning, known as Manufacture des Rames]. Plateforme Ouverte du Patrimoine (in French). 1988. Archived from the original on January 3, 2022.
- "Ancienne manufacture royale de draps Le Dijonval" [Former royal sheet factory Le Dijonval]. Plateforme Ouverte du Patrimoine (in French). 1992. Archived from the original on January 3, 2022.
- "Manufacture des Tabacs" [Tobacco Factory]. Plateforme Ouverte du Patrimoine (in French). 1992. Archived from the original on January 3, 2022.
- "Ancien four à porcelaine G.D.A." [Former G.D.A. porcelain kiln]. Plateforme Ouverte du Patrimoine (in French). 1992. Archived from the original on January 3, 2022.
- "Manufacture des tabacs de Morlaix" [Tobacco factory of Morlaix]. Plateforme Ouverte du Patrimoine (in French). 1997. Archived from the original on January 3, 2022.
- "Ancienne manufacture royale de Montolieu" [Former royal factory of Montolieu]. Plateforme Ouverte du Patrimoine (in French). 2004. Archived from the original on January 3, 2022.
- Halleux, Robert (2010). "Bernard Palissy". Archives Nationales (in French). Archived from the original on January 3, 2022.
- Schotter, Bernard (2015). "Création de la Manufacture royale d'Alençon" [Creation of the Manufacture royale d'Alençon]. Archives Nationales (in French). Archived from the original on January 21, 2025.
- "Manufacture des Gobelins" [Gobelins Manufactory]. Mobilier National (in French). 2017. p. 2. Archived from the original on January 3, 2022.
- "Châteauroux et les cités lainières d'Europe. De la manufacture royale de draps à l'usine Balsan" [Châteauroux and the wool cities of Europe. From the royal cloth factory to the Balsan factory]. Archives Nationales (in French). 2018. Archived from the original on May 26, 2023.
