= Claude Grégory =

French literary critic and editor (1921-2010)

- Born: 1921
- Died: 2010; France
- Occupation: Literary critic

Claude Grégory (January 8, 1921 — April 24, 2010) was a French literary critic and editor. He was born in Joinville-le-Pont, in the Alpes-de-Haute-Provence. Born Claude Zalta, he adopted the surname Grégory during his time in the French resistance.

Grégory was the founding editor-in-chief of the Encyclopædia Universalis from its inception in 1968.

He died in 2010, in Banon.
