= Barthélemy de Laffemas =

French economist

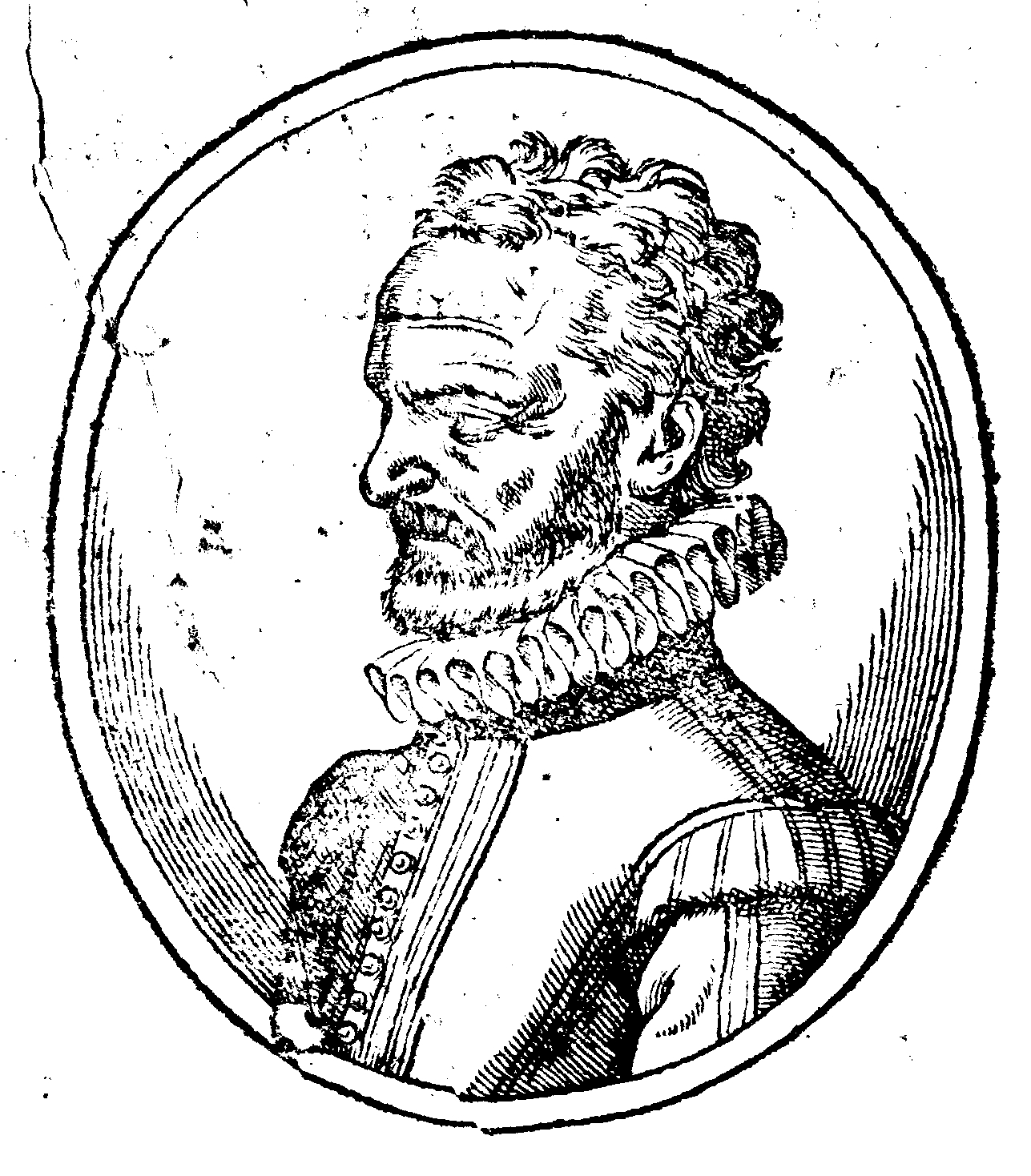
Barthélemy de Laffemas (1545–1612)

Barthélemy de Laffemas was an economist, born in Beausemblant, France in 1545. He is officially recorded as dying in Paris in 1612. However, it is rumoured that he actually died on September 23, 1611, after falling from his horse. He is known as the first person to write about underconsumption

== Biography ==
=== Beginnings ===
Coming from the gentry Protestant, poor, he worked and became a tailor. He left the Dauphiné and went to Navarre. There he met Henry of Navarre, the future Henry IV of France.

Then, in 1576, he became a "silver merchant" for the king. In 1579, the king owes his supplier 483 491 pounds. He had to borrow the money for his business, paid in annuities. In a memoir, Laffemas wrote that he lifted "..the silverware shop of the king, and borrowed over two hundred thousand crowns ...". These annuities are not as good and he was pursued by the creditors, and imprisoned for debt. When Henry of Navarre became King of France he was freed.

=== General of Trade ===
In 1596, in his "memory to draw Manufactures and works of the kingdom", it proposes to extend the guilds and develop the chambers of trade. He also advises to reduce imports and develop royal factories, supported by the state. Henry partly supports this program.

In 1598 Laffemas continued writing his ideas on trade and manufacture. Writing his ideas may have been required to receive support from Henry IV. They acted as a balance to those of Sully, more interested in agriculture. In the same year Laffemas published Les Trésors et richesses pour mettre l'Estat en splendeur, which blasted those who frowned on French silks because the industry created employment for the poor. This is the first known mention of Underconsumption Theory, which is later refined by John Maynard Keynes.

=== New letters ===
New letters patent of July 20, 1602 ordered the Commission to assemble regularly to attend to the execution of previous orders required by the body and communities of merchants.

He received the king, 15 November 1602. He advocated the mercantilism and encouraged the development of trade and manufacturing, differing in this from the Minister Sully, which emphasized the agriculture. He had a great influence in the areas of labor, economic and social organization and a leading role in the history of silk in Europe.

The committee concludes its meetings on October 22, 1604.

The political economy project of Henry IV of France based on the spread of plantations and silk industry followed Laffemas's advice. He was helped by the Protestant agronomist Olivier de Serres, a Protestant figure and author of a famous thesis on "The collection of Silk". He also got help from François Traucat, a native gardener of Nîmes. Traucat was the originator of the intensive mulberry plantations in the South of France, he planted four million in mulberry bushes in Provence and Languedoc.

In 1602, a Royal Decision requires every parish in the country to own a mulberry bush nursery and silk. In Paris, the Gobelins manufactory is created and the Bois de Boulogne a silkworm is built surrounded by 15,000 mulberry trees.

This is also the time when the first river navigation channel is dug, the Briare Canal, while the Dutch capital is put to use to dry part of the Marais Poitevin, using as at the Flemish engineers refugee brand new Netherlands, first Protestant republic in Europe.

For domestic trade, Barthélemy de Laffemas emphasizes the rehabilitation and development of roads and bridges, waterways, creating service letter post. For foreign trade, source of wealth, it grows to transit trade and warehousing, trade with the Levant, the colonial trade with the creation of large French East India Company and Western.

With the end of the Royal Commission in 1604, implementation of manufacturing projects will also stop at the image of that which was to be built north of the Place Royale, in Paris. In 1608, Barthélemy de Laffemas complains in a treaty that his advice was ignored. The development of silk manufactures stopped and France resumed imports.

== Nobility ==
In the marriage contract of his son, passed November 10, 1608, BARTHELMY is called noble. It is not known how Barthélemy became noble because it is unclear whether his father, Isaac, was. The ennoblement Barthélemy had to be acquired in return for his services.

== Publications ==
Laffemas had a large number of publications about his ideas on trade and enriching the kingdom.

=== French publications ===
- Source de plusieurs abus et monopoles qui se sont glissez et coulez sur le peuple de France, depuis trente ans ou environ, à la ruyne de l'Estat, dont il se trouve moyen par un règlement général d'empescher à l'advenir tel abus, présenté au Roy et à nosseigneurs de l'assemblée (1596)
- Reiglement général pour dresser les manufactures en ce royaume et couper le cours des draps de soye et autres marchandises qui perdent et ruynent l'État. Avec l'extraict de l'advis que MM. de l'Assemblée tenue à Rouen ont baillé à S. M., que l'entrée de toutes sortes de marchandises de soye et laines manufacturées hors ce royaume, soient deffendues en iceluy. Ensemble le moyen de faire les soyes par toute la France (1597)
- Responce à messieurs de Lyon, lesquels veulent empescher, rompre le cours des marchandises d'Italie, avec le préjudice de leurs foires, et l'abus aux changes (1598)
- Les Trésors et richesses pour mettre l'Estat en splendeur et monstrer au vray la ruine des François par le trafic et négoce des estrangers (1598)
- Advertissement et responce aux marchands et autres, où il est touché des changes, banquiers et banqueroutiers (1600)
- Advis et remonstrance à MM. les commissaires députez du Roy au faict du commerce, avec les moyens de soulager le peuple des tailles, et autre bien nécessaire pour la police de ce royaume (1600)
- L'Incrédulité ou l'ignorance de ceux qui ne veulent cognoistre le bien et repos de l'Estat et veoir renaistre la vie heureuse des François. Ce discours contient cinq petits traictez (1600). Contient : Le Cinquiesme traité du commerce parlant des procez et chiquaneries et voir l'honneur que l'on doit porter aux juges de la justice, avec la faute et la création de celle des consuls, et autres telles préjudiciables au public. Second traité : Advertissement et responce aux marchands et autres, où il est touché des changes, banquiers et banqueroutiers. Troisiesme traité : Les moyens de chasser la gueuserye, contraindre les fainéants, faire et employer les pauvres
- La Commission, édit et partie des mémoires de l'ordre et établissement du commerce général des manufactures en ce royaume, proposés par Barthélemy de Laffemas (1601)
- Les Discours d'une liberté générale et vie heureuse pour le bien du peuple (1601)Gallica
- VIIe traicté du commerce, de la vie du loyal marchand, avec la commission du Roy, et bien qu'il faict aux peuples et royaumes (1601)
- Neuf advertissements pour servir à l'utilité publicque, advenus sur le bonheur de la naissance de Mgr le Daulphin, assavoir est, d'un bon et rare ouvrier françois : faire fil d'or au tiltre de Milan; faire croistre le ris en France; bluter les farines par des enfants; faire fromage à la vraye mode de Milan; faire croistre esperges grosses de deux poulces, et longues d'un pied; comme les estrangers possèdent la navigation de la mer et les richesses des foires; certain advis de fabriquer toutes étoffes en France; le désordre des monnoyes (1601)
- Remonstrance au peuple suivant les édicts et ordonnances des roys, à cause du luxe et superfluité des soyes, clinquants en habits, ruine générale (1601)
- Remonstrances politiques sur l'abus des charlatans, pipeurs et enchanteurs (1601) Text online
- Comme l'on doibt permettre la liberté du transport de l'or et de l'argent hors du royaume et par tel moyen conserver le nostre, et attirer celuy des estrangers. Avec le moyen infaillible de faire continuellement travailler les monnoyes de ce royaume, qui demeurent inutilles (1602)
- Le Tesmoignage certain du profict et revenu des soyes de France, par preuves certifiées du païs de Languedoc (1602)
- Lettres et exemples de feu la Royne mère, comme elle faisoit travailler aux manufactures, et fournissoit aux ouvriers de ses propres deniers. Avec la preuve certaine de faire les soyes en ce royaume pour la provision d'iceluy et, en peu d'années, en fournir aux estrangers (1602)
- Le Mérite du travail et labeur, dédié aux chefs de la police (1602)
- Le Plaisir de la noblesse et autres qui ont des éritages aux champs, sur la preuve certaine et profict des estauffes et soyes qui se font à Paris (1603)
- La Façon de faire et semer la graine de meuriers, les eslever en pepinieres, & les replanter aux champs : gouverner & nourrir les vers à soye au Climat de la France, plus facilement que par les memoires de tous ceux qui en ont escript (1604)
- Le Naturel et profit admirable du meurier (1604)
- La Ruine et disette d'argent, qu'ont apporté les draps de soyes en France, avec des raisons que n'ont jamais cogneu les François, pour y remédier (1608)
- Advertissement sur les divers crimes des banqueroutiers. Suivant les édits et ordonnances des rois de France (1609)
- Recueil présenté au Roy, de ce qui se passe en l'Assemblée du commerce, au Palais à Paris (1604)
- Advis sur l'usage des passements d'or et d'argent (1610)

==== Published after death ====
- Le Terme de Pasques sans trébuchet, en vers burlesque (1649)

==== Updated publications ====
- Mémoires sur le commerce, texte établi par Éric de Brissac, Paleo, Clermont-Ferrand, 2003
