= Encyclopædia Universalis =

French-language general encyclopedia

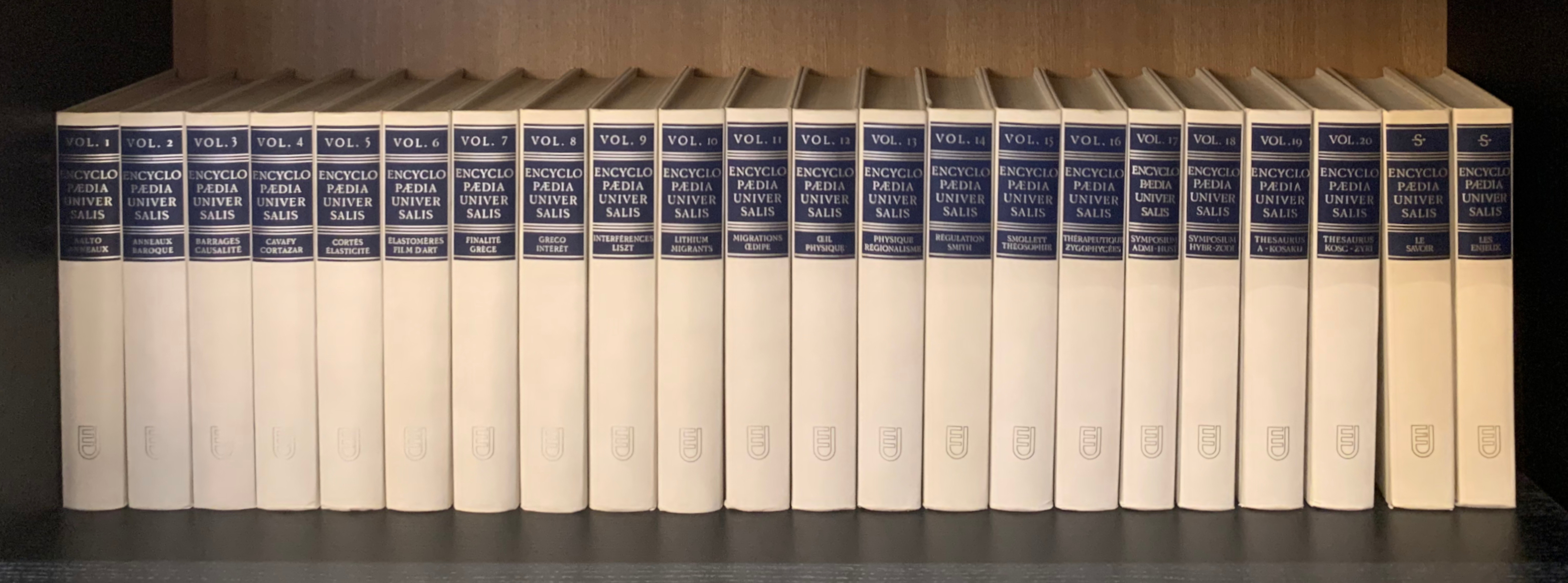
- First edition set
- Language: French
- Genre: General knowledge encyclopedia
- Publisher: Encyclopædia Britannica, Inc.
- Website: www.universalis.fr

The Encyclopædia Universalis is a French-language general encyclopedia published by Encyclopædia Britannica, Inc., a privately held company. The articles of the Encyclopædia Universalis are aimed at educated adult readers, and written by a staff of full-time editors and expert contributors.

== History ==
The Encyclopædia Universalis was originally published by the publishing company Encyclopædia Universalis SA. This company was created in 1966 by a specialist in publishing and selling books and collections by mail order, the French Book Club (CFL), owned by the Aubry family, as well as Encyclopædia Britannica Inc. (publisher of the Encyclopædia Britannica), the most famous English-language encyclopedia, owned at the time by the Foundation of the University of Chicago. This joint ventureà 50/50 was intended to combine the skills of the two shareholders in each of the two forms of distribution then essential for encyclopedias: mail order on the one hand and door-to-door sales on the other hand, a specialty of American society.

This formula, as well as the quality of the successive versions of the Encyclopædia Universalis, the first volume of which appeared in 1968 under the direction of Claude Grégory with graphic design by Pierre Faucheux, enabled remarkable commercial success until the early 1990s, when sales began to decline.

During the second half of the 1990s, the introduction and rapid improvement of electronic versions of the encyclopedia, using editorial funds from the paper version enriched with numerous specific contributions, under the leadership of its president Pierre Le Manh and the editorial director Louis Lecomte, allowed the Encyclopædia Universalis to experience a second period of success and growth. On the other hand, this transformation modified the economic balance between the distribution networks, thus leading to growing conflicts between the shareholders, the departure in the early 2000s of several directors to other areas and the appointment - on demand of Britannica - from a receiver who managed the company until July 2005, when the French Book Club finally sold its shares to Encyclopædia Britannica Inc. at the end of an auction process, after forty years of partnership.

== See also ==
- Encyclopædia Britannica
