= François Traucat =

French gardener

Francois Traucat (first half of 16th-century) was a gardener and treasure hunter from Nîmes, France. He is remembered for enthusiastically pursuing the planting of mulberry trees in Southern France to encourage silk production. In these efforts he was aided by Olivier de Serres and encouraged by Barthélemy de Laffemas, and the economic policies of King Henry IV of France.

He is also remembered for expending his resources in searching for a treasure associated the Gallic-Ancient Roman Tour Magne in Nîmes, based on some lines in the prophecies of Nostradamus.
