= Caffoy =

Furnishing material

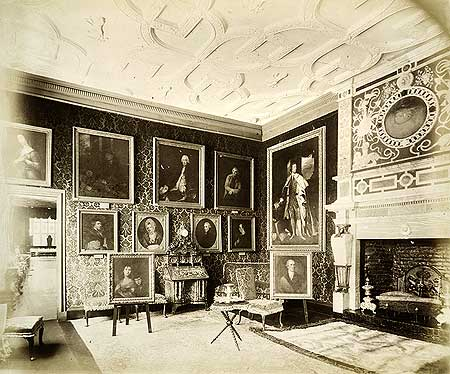
The crimson drawing room or Reynolds room walls decorated with crimson-stamped woolen velvet "caffoy".

Caffoy (also spelled caffa, cafoy, or cuffoye) was a cut pile woolen velvet material popular for upholstery. It was a decorative textile characterized by its wool pile designs, which were designed to imitate the appearance of silk velvets and damasks. It was originally made from wool and was used to imitate silk furnishing damasks. However, in the 16th century, it may have also been made from silk. Norwich, a major center for worsted weaving, was a major producer of caffoy. In 1579, it was featured alongside other contemporary fabrics such as Darnex, Mockado, and figure-sized Russel in a pageant commemorating the queen's visit to Norwich. Caffoy was popular during the 17th and early 18th centuries.

The fabric on a set of chairs listed in an inventory at Erddig, near Wrexham, has been identified as Caffoy. The inventory from 1726 mentions seven walnut chairs, four of which were originally upholstered in Caffoy, a cut-wool velvet in bright yellow and deep crimson from John Meller's Saloon. In 1732, the antiquarian John Loveday admired them greatly. During the Victorian era, Caffoy pelmets were introduced for the windows at either end of the room and the chair covers were changed.

A flock wallpaper used in the 18th century was called "Caffoy paper."

== Origin ==
Prior to the establishment of the Spitalfields silk industry in London around 1700, the most fashionable silks were produced in France and Italy, especially Lyon and Genoa. Genoa was renowned for its opulent, large-patterned silk velvet with a plain or satin basis and a silk pile. France and England imitated Genoese velvet from 1670 until 1750. Spitalfields silk producers, who produced materials for local and international demand, rivalled their continental competitors in terms of quality, but relied only on France for inspiration, the country where the majority of decorative arts styles originated.

Some velvets, such as moquette, caffoy, and plush, were made of wool and were more durable than silk. Large quantities of predominantly plain-patterned velvets produced in Holland are now (inaccurately) called Utrecht velvets.

== Characteristics and use ==
Caffoy was a type of woolen velvet fabric with a pile surface. In records, there are variations of cut and without pile surfaces, as well as mixed use of wool and silk. Caffoy, also spelled cafoy, was a pattern that looked like damask. In woolen velvet, the pile is formed mechanically during the weaving of the cloth structure, similar to knotting in carpet weaving.

The caffoy made in Norwich was patterned, with piled wool to look like silk furnishing fabrics like damask and velvet. The fabric was in use until the 18th century.

Caffoy was used for a variety of purposes, including upholstery, drapery, and wall decorations. Documented histories of using Caffoy can be found in 18th-century decoration materials.

=== Upholstery and drapery ===
Velvet, brocade, satin, taffeta, damask, lutestring, tabby, and sarsnet were the most common silk weaves used for upholstery, whereas the principal woolen materials included harateen, tammy, moreen, camlet, and caffoy.There were a lot of woolen fabrics with piles hard to distinguish, and Caffoy and camlet were the most common ones listed in inventories.

== Use in English country houses ==
Below are the furnishing histories of several historic English country houses that mention "Caffoy."

=== Erddig ===
John Meller (1665–1773) was the owner of Erdigg in 1716 and furnished it with exquisite furnishings.

Meller's Saloon was one-third its current size and was dominated by eight walnut armchairs and a sofa. These armchairs and sofa had extremely rare dark crimson and yellow caffoy loose covers that were designed to complement the crimson and yellow curtains that once hung in this room. This was the first instance of intricately coordinated color schemes of increasing richness and complexity.

The surviving walnut chairs from Meller's Saloon, with their cut velvet caffoy seat furniture are now placed in the Gallery on the second floor.

=== Houghton Hall ===
Caffoy was used in the interior decoration of different rooms and places and upholstering furniture inside Houghton Hall, a key building in the history of Neo-Palladian architecture in England.

It was decorated with caffoy, a material with a coarse structure and a bold figure that was reasonably priced, and then with a finer velvet in the drawing room, similar to the Erddig in North Wales, which was renovated in the early 1720s.

Hall and family room decorations included caffoy hung on walls and decorated with original caffoy. The colors used in the figure and ground had lower contrast. Thomas Roberts, the Royal chair maker, supplied 164 yards for £118 18s between April 1729 and January 1730-31.

The material was also used for furnishing furniture, such as chair décor. In 1745, the furniture included a marble-topped, giltwood pier table with glass, a set of yellow caffoy-upholstered chairs, settees, and a couch, a card table, a pair of curtains, and a chandelier. All of these pieces were ideal for a night of conversation and entertainment.

In the drawing room, the exquisite collection of portraits from the 17th century was originally hung on yellow caffoy damask, a wool and silk material of lesser quality than the silk used in the State Apartment. Although it was replaced on the walls by rose-colored silk in 1792.

=== Knole ===
Knole is another English country mansion in which Caffoy uses historical connections, such as in the Reynolds Room or the Crimson Drawing Room, which have their unique names because the walls are covered with a rare, crimson-stamped woolen velvet "caffoy" from the middle of the 18th century. The majority of the paintings displayed against it are by Joshua Reynolds, an English painter. The "caffoy" chairs and sofas that are still there are placed on the north and south walls of the Reynolds Room.

The seat furniture along the north and south walls includes the rest of the set of "caffoy" chairs and settees seen in the Reynolds Room, as well as more armchairs and stools from the late seventeenth century that the 6th Earl of Dorset bought from the Royal palaces between 1689 and 1697.

=== Wallpapers ===
In the 18th century, 'caffoy paper' was an English specialty. It was 'flock paper', which is another name for 'caffoy paper'. Not all wallpaper in the 17th century was flocking, but it was not widely used. In 1699, a writer said that 'paper tapestries' should be treated in the same way as woolen hangings. Wallpaper has been used in London since the time of Charles II. In 1712, shops in London that sold wallpaper were taxed. Because wallpaper was sometimes designed to look like patterned fabrics, 'a peculiar sort of Flock work in imitation of Caffaws, and other hangings of Curious forms and colours' was offered as wallpaper in London as early as 1720.

== More observations and mentions ==
- Meller's 1726 inventory of the Gallery lists an abundance of caned furniture. The daybed and stools also had caffoy loose covers. Caffoy was also used to furnish servant rooms.
- John Loveday (antiquary) observed the fabric in Houghton, where 'the Salon is hung with Scarlet Caffoy', in 1731.
- Sir John Smyth's 1741 home had a striped bedsheet and blue caffoy furniture.
- In 1755, Mrs. Delany mentions 'mohair cafoy' paper in a 1761 letter to Walpole: 132 Caffoy was usually a wool-velvet material, but it appears that it was mixed with mohair in this case.

== See also ==
- Art collections of Holkham Hall
