= Art collections of Holkham Hall =

Coordinates: 52.94939°N 0.80728°E

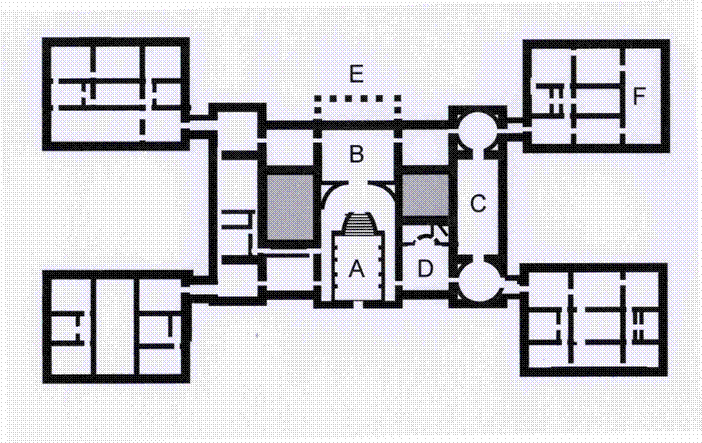
Simplified, unscaled plan of the piano nobile at Holkham, showing the four symmetrical wings at each corner of the principal block. South is at the top of the plan. 'A' Marble Hall; 'B' The Saloon; 'C' Statue Gallery, with octagonal tribunes at each end; 'D' Dining room (the classical apse, gives access to the tortuous and discreet route by which the food reached the dining room from the distant kitchen), 'E' The South Portico; 'F' The Library in the self-contained family wing.

The art collection of Holkham Hall in Norfolk, England, remains very largely that which the original owner intended the house to display; the house was designed around the art collection acquired (a few works were commissioned) by Thomas Coke, 1st Earl of Leicester, during his Grand Tour of Italy during 1712–18. To complete the scheme it was necessary to send Matthew Brettingham the younger to Rome between 1747 and 1754 to purchase further works of art.

The design of the house was a collaborative effort between Thomas Coke, Richard Boyle, 3rd Earl of Burlington, and William Kent, with Matthew Brettingham the elder acting as the on-site architect. The house was built between 1736 and 1764, with work on the interiors only completed in 1771. By 1769 all the men involved had died, leaving Thomas's widow, Lady Margaret Tufton, Countess of Leicester (1700–1775), to oversee the completion of the house. Their only child to survive infancy, Edward Coke, Viscount Coke, had died without issue in 1753.

The house is designed with a corps de logis containing the state rooms on the first floor (piano nobile), surrounded by four wings: to the south-west the family wing, to the north-west the guest wing, to the south-east the chapel wing and to the north-east the kitchen wing. With all the intervening doors open it is possible to stand in the Long Library and look down the full length of the southern State Rooms and see the east window of the Chapel in the opposing wing the full 344 feet (105 m) length of the house. The family wing is a self-contained residence, meant for daily living.

The Marble Hall is in the centre of the north front. To its west is the North Dining Room (also called the State Dining Room), then along the west side of the corps de logis is the Statue Gallery, to its east on the south front is the Drawing Room, then the Saloon, South Dining Room, Landscape Room north of which on the east side of the corps de logis is the Green State Bedroom, Green State Dressing Room, North State Dressing Room, the North State Bedroom, and finally to the west the State Sitting Room with the Marble Hall to its west.

Much thought went into the placing of sculptures and paintings, involving subtle connections and contrasts in the mythological and historical characters and stories depicted. The state rooms were designed with symmetrical arrangements of doors, windows and fireplaces; this meant that some walls have false doors to balance real doors. This need for balance and harmony extended to the placing of sculpture, paintings and furniture, each artwork being balanced by a piece of similar size though sometimes of contrasting subject matter. Examples are the two paintings commissioned by Thomas Coke above the fireplaces in the Saloon, Tarquin Raping Lucretia and Perseus and Andromeda. In the first painting Sextus Tarquinius, the son of the last king of Rome, is violating a woman, while in the second painting a man is rescuing a woman from being killed. The result of the rape of Lucretia is the overthrow of a tyrant; the rescue of Andromeda results in Perseus becoming a king. Other connections are the sculptures in the two exedras of the Statue Gallery: in the southern one are two satyrs, symbols of ungoverned passion and lust, while opposite are the virgin Athena, goddess of wisdom, and Ceres, the preserver of marriage and sacred law. In the Landscape Room it is possible to go from looking at the paintings to looking through the window at a real Landscape garden, one influenced by the images on the walls.

The works collected in Italy include: sculpture, paintings, mosaics, books, manuscripts and old master drawings (most of which have been sold). The books included one of Leonardo da Vinci's note books now known as the Codex Leicester which was sold from the collection in 1980.

== Sculpture ==
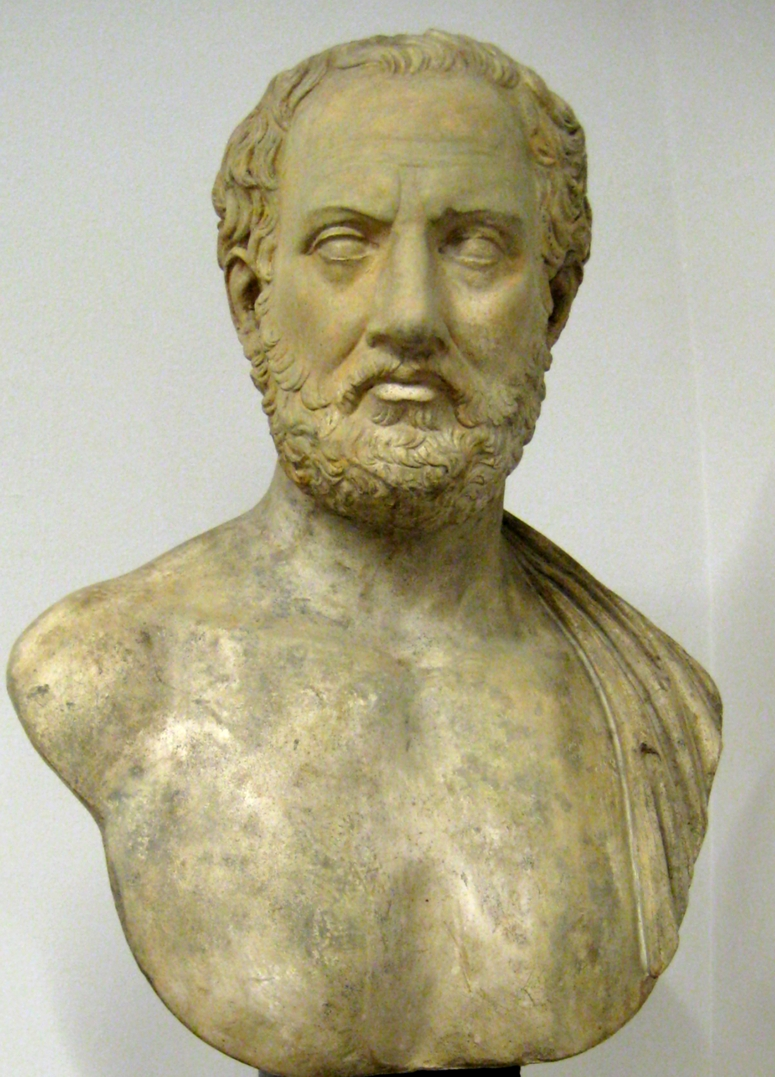
Plaster copy of the Holkham bust of Thucydides

Grand Tour. The collection of 60 Ancient Roman marble sculptures is amongst the finest in any private collection in the world. The collection consists of both life size and greater than life size statues and busts that include several of the Twelve Olympians, characters from Greek mythology, ancient Greek philosophers and ancient Romans of the imperial era, plus other sculptures. Most have been repaired to varying extents. The full length statues are mainly displayed in the Statue Gallery along with busts which are also to be found throughout the State Rooms.

Matthew Brettingham the Younger dispatched the first consignment of sculptures from Rome in 1749. Because of the difficulty in getting permission from the Papal authorities to export the sculpture of Isis the second consignment was not dispatched until 1751, after which sculptures were exported annually until the last shipment in the summer of 1754.

Among the finest of the works are:

- The bust of Thucydides dated 100–120 AD, of Carrara marble 79.5 cm high, purchased by Matthew Brettingham. With only minor repairs this is one of the finest busts of the era to survive. This powerful characterisation presents the historian in late middle age with a strong-boned squarish face with a high broad forehead, receding temples and bald patch. The three furrows on the brow make this a convincing portrait.
- The goddess Artemis/Diana dated to 190–200 AD, believed to be a copy of a mid-4th-century BC Hellenistic original, with only minor repairs. Purchased in Rome by Thomas Coke on 13 April 1717 for 900 crowns (about £250), this was Thomas's most expensive purchase. The marble statue is 1.86 metres high, shown wearing a peplos, holding a bow in the left hand; the right hand is reaching for an arrow held in a quiver on the sculpture's back.
- Marsyas, dated to 180–190 AD, probably a copy of a 2nd-century BC Greek statue. Originally owned by Cardinal Alessandro Albani, it was purchased by Matthew Brettingham. The marble statue is 2.01 metres in height. The bearded figure is naked, left elbow leaning on a tree stump, in a contrapposto stance, with a lion skin knotted across its chest and hanging down the back. The right arm is bent upwards holding a cudgel.
- The Empress Livia, dated mid-1st century AD, purchased for 300 crowns by Matthew Brettingham. Made from Parian marble 2.23 metres in height, the statue is contrapposto, dressed in a floor length chiton girt under the breasts, forming an apoptygma or overfold, with short sleeves. A cloak is pulled to the crown of the head and envelopes the lower body, crossing the left shoulder and drawn across the front of the body and is draped over the left forearm. In the left hand is held a bunch of wheat ears.
- The god Poseidon/Neptune dated late 1st to early 2nd centuries AD is thought to be a copy of a Greek sculpture of the 1st half of the 2nd century BC, purchased in Rome in 1752 by Matthew Brettingham for 800 crowns. Made from Parian marble, it is 1.73 metres high, the god is depicted naked, standing; the left leg is slightly bent and drawn back resting on the ball of the foot. The left hand holds onto a trident resting on the ground and the right arm is raised slightly. The head has thick curly hair and a beard.

In the following list sculptures marked with an * were purchased by Thomas Coke on his Grand Tour; any marked # were purchased by Matthew Brettingham the younger.

The Roman statues include:

- The Statue Gallery: the southern exedra: Satyrs, one playing a flute# and one wearing a pigskin#; south of the fireplace: Meleager#, Marsyas# & Poseidon/Neptune#; above the fireplace: Apollo*; north of the fireplace: Dionysus/Bacchus#, Artemis/Diana* and Aphrodite/Venus#; the northern exedra: Athena/Minerva# and Demeter/Ceres#.
- The North Tribune: Isis# repaired with a head from another statue, Livia# repaired with a head of Lucius Verus* and an unidentified man wearing a toga (purchased as Lucius Antonius)*.
- The Marble Hall: in the niches of the apse: a statue repaired with a head of Septimius Severus# and a heavily restored statue of Julia Mamaea*; within the niches of the exedra an Ephebos restored as a Satyr# and a heavily restored Satyr playing cymbals*.
- Private Rooms: Tyche/Fortuna# (purchased as Isis) and a torso of a draped male (purchased as Jupiter*. (It was this statue that William Kent intended to restore and place in the centre of the stairs in the Marble Hall, thus placing the main god of Olympus at the literal centre of the House).

The Roman busts include depictions/portraits of the following:

- The Marble Hall: On a half-column outside the door to the State Sitting Room is the bust of Roma dated 130–140 AD; the head is of white marble mounted on a post-Roman body of rosso antico marble (probably purchased in Rome by Edward Coke in 1737).
- The Statue Gallery: Cybele* in the pediment above Apollo, flanking the northern exedra; Lucius Cornelius Sulla# and Thucydides#; flanking the southern exedra Lucius Junius Brutus# and Pseudo-Seneca#; between the windows an unidentified man# and a woman# (these last two are not part of Thomas Coke's arrangement of the sculptures).
- The North Tribune: Above the doors, Emperor Philip as a youth# and Faustina the Elder#.
- The South Tribune: Above the doors and bookcases, Hadrian#, Julia Mamaea#, Julia di Tito#, Caesar Marcus Aurelius*, Gallienus# and Geta#.
- The North Dining Room: In oval niches above the fireplaces Aelius Verus# and Juno#; flanking the apse Marcus Aurelius# & Caesar Geta# (these last two busts have white marble heads mounted on post-Roman bodies of variegated marble).
- The Saloon: Above the central door Hera/Juno#.
- Private Rooms: Zeus/Jupiter*, Artemis (acquired c1737, origin unknown), Salonina#, Nerva*, Plato#, Caracalla#, Gordian III#, Maecenas# and a badly eroded male head, possibly Greek, c400 BC. acquired by the 5th Earl in 1955.

Other Roman sculptures include:

- The Statue Gallery: Between Apollo and the fireplace an oval white marble relief of Julius Caesar# in profile, enclosed in an 18th-century dark veined marble frame.
- The South Vestibule: Flanking the north door, the Ash Altar of Caius Calpurnius Cognitus*, 1st quarter of the 1st century AD, and the Cinerarium of Petronius Hedychrus*, 1st quarter 2nd century AD.
- Private Rooms: Profile relief of Carneades#, a statuette of the Nile river god#, Sarcophagus of T. Flabius Hermetes#, marble Oscillum# depicting a cavorting satyr, a Herma# and fragments of a sarcophagus decorated with sea-creatures*.

There are several sculptures dating from the post-Roman era:

- The Marble Hall contains a series of plaster casts of eight sculptures: in the niches of the east wall Apollo, Flora, Bacchus, Isis, and in the niches of the west wall Aphrodite, Hermes, St. Susanna and Capitoline Antinous, plus a plaster copy of Louis-François Roubiliac's marble bust of Thomas Coke above the door in the apse (the original is part of his tomb in Tittleshall church), and on marble half-columns Francis Chantrey's marble busts of 'Coke of Norfolk' and a second one of Thomas Coke. There is a set of four white marble reliefs in the apse flanking the niches (added by 'Coke of Norfolk'): Thomas Banks's The Death of Germanicus, Richard Westmacott's Death of Socrates, Stoldo Lorenzi's Lorenzo I and Francis Chantrey's The Passing of the Reform Bill 1832, plus a marble plaque of two woodcock by Chantrey.
- The Drawing Room: Marble copies of busts of Marcus Aurelius and Caracalla on the mantelpiece, and plaster busts of Faustina, Carneades, Pythagoras and Zeno above the doors.
- The South Dining Room: Four plaster busts above the doors.
- The South Vestibule consisting of a rectangular room beneath the Portico linked by five arches to a semicircular section beneath the Saloon, that has a large niche flanked by smaller ones each side of the north door; these used to house plaster casts of statues, to the west: Dancing Faun, Apollo Belvedere and Ganymede; and to the east: Ptolemy, Meleager and The Venus des Belles Fesses. There also used to be busts on brackets between the piers of the arches: Cicero, Plato, Lysias and Seneca.
- The Long Library: above the pedimented bookcases a marble bust of Alexander Pope and plaster copies of busts of Venus, Cybele and A Vestal Virgin.
- The Classical Library: six plaster busts above the four bookcases and doors on the side walls.
- Private Rooms: A series of 18th-century marble copies of ancient busts, including: Homer and Alexander the Great. 'Coke of Norfolk' commissioned marble busts including Napoleon and Charles James Fox
- The Corridor linking the Guest Wing to the North Tribune: in niches flanking the bookcase and window, plaster casts of Venus de' Medici, Camillus, Urania and Apollino (Medici Apollo).

== Paintings ==
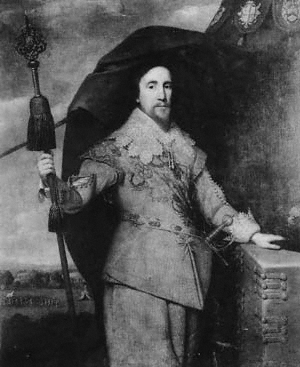
Sir Nicholas Crispe

The 7th Earl of Leicester restored most of the paintings to the positions designed for them. Three paintings however are no longer in the collection. These are Titian's Venus and the Lute Player, sold in 1931, now in the Metropolitan Museum of Art, which has been replaced in the current hang in the South Dining Room by Melchior d'Hondecoeter's bird painting. The Saloon also originally had in the centre of the side walls Chiari's Continence of Scipio (commissioned by Thomas Coke in Rome) and Pietro da Cortona's Coriolanus: their present whereabouts is unknown. A whole-length portrait of Sir Nicholas Crispe was reported to be in the collection of the Earl of Leicester.

The Rubens and Van Dyck paintings originally hung in the centres of the side walls in the Drawing Room are now hung in the Saloon and are replaced in the Drawing Room by family portraits. The fact that the greater works of art were not originally hung in the Saloon, the main room of the state apartment, suggests that the subject matter of the lost paintings was of prime importance to Thomas Coke's scheme.

The Continence of Scipio depicts the return of a captured young woman to her fiancé by Scipio, having refused to accept her from his troops as a prize of war, and Coriolanus using his military victory as an excuse to fight democracy and his failure leading to his betrayal of Rome. Again like the paintings over the fireplaces in this room, these paintings contrast the use and abuse of power, in this case clemency versus betrayal.

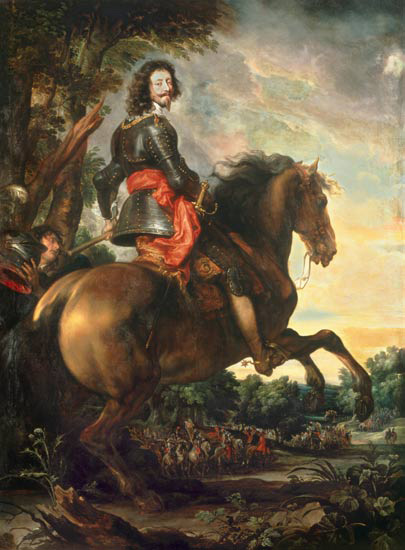
Van Dyke, Duc D'Arenberg

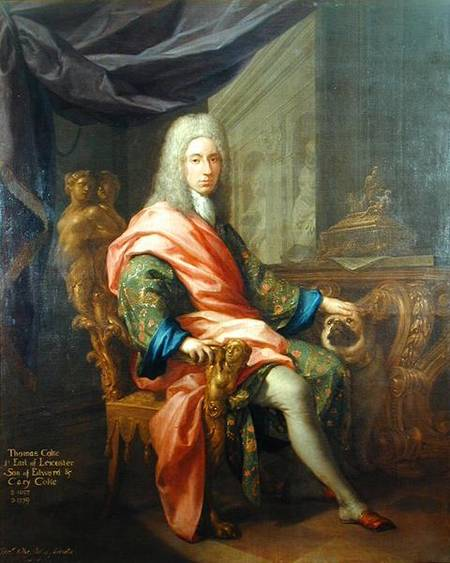
Treisani's Thomas Coke, Earl of Leicester

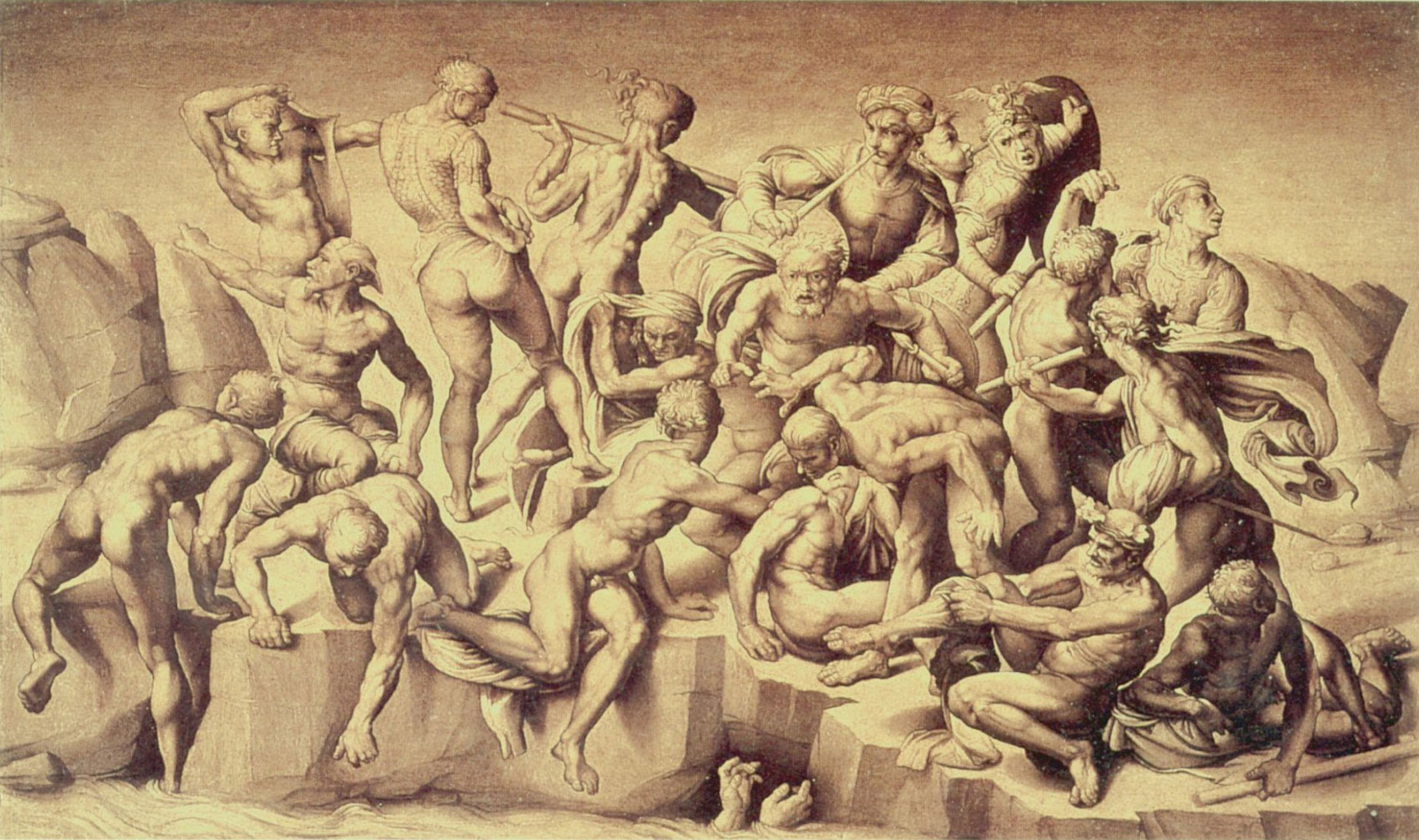
Bastiano da Sangallo, The Battle of Cascina after Michelangelo

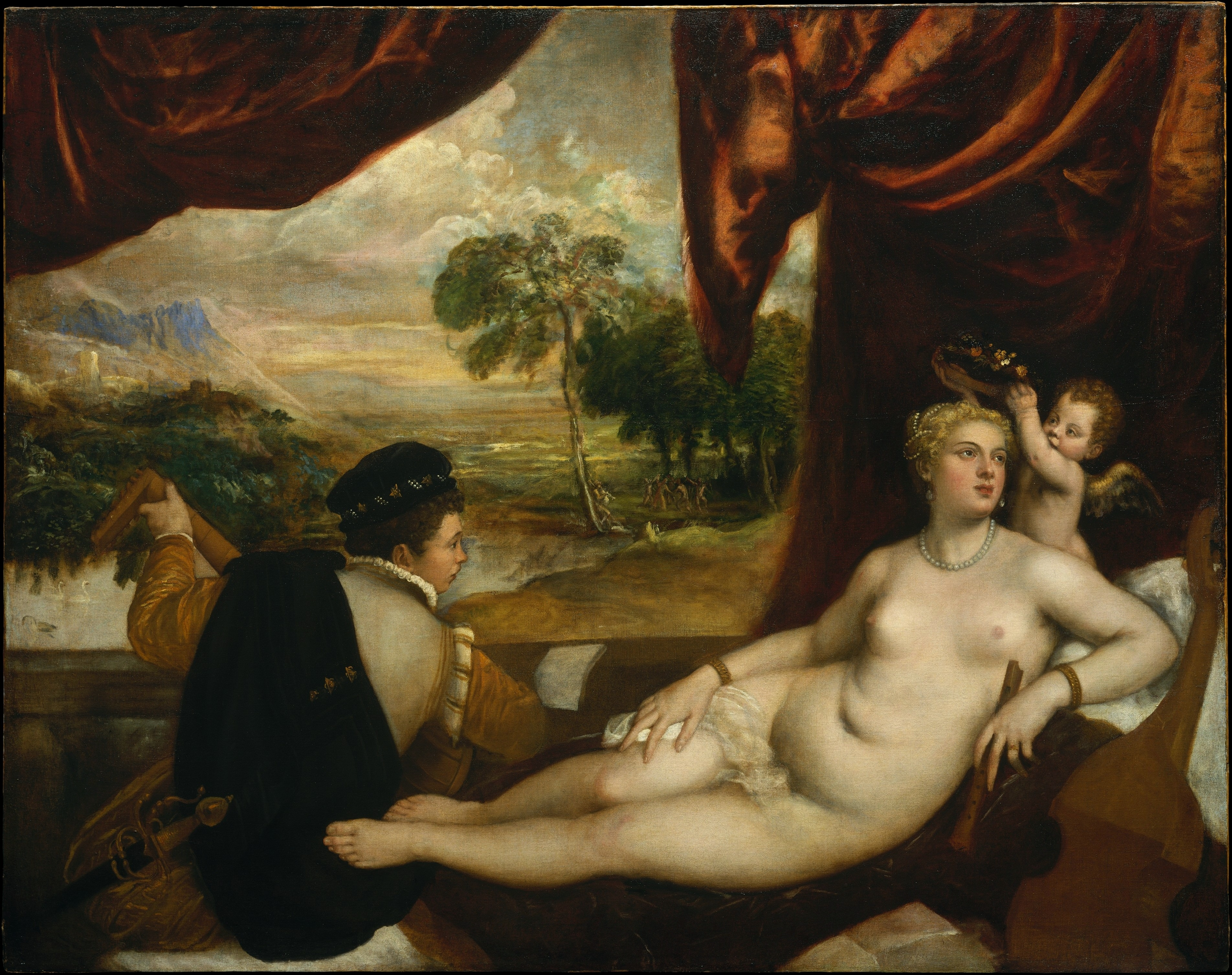
Titian, Venus and the Lute Player, sold in 1931 and now in the Metropolitan Museum of Art

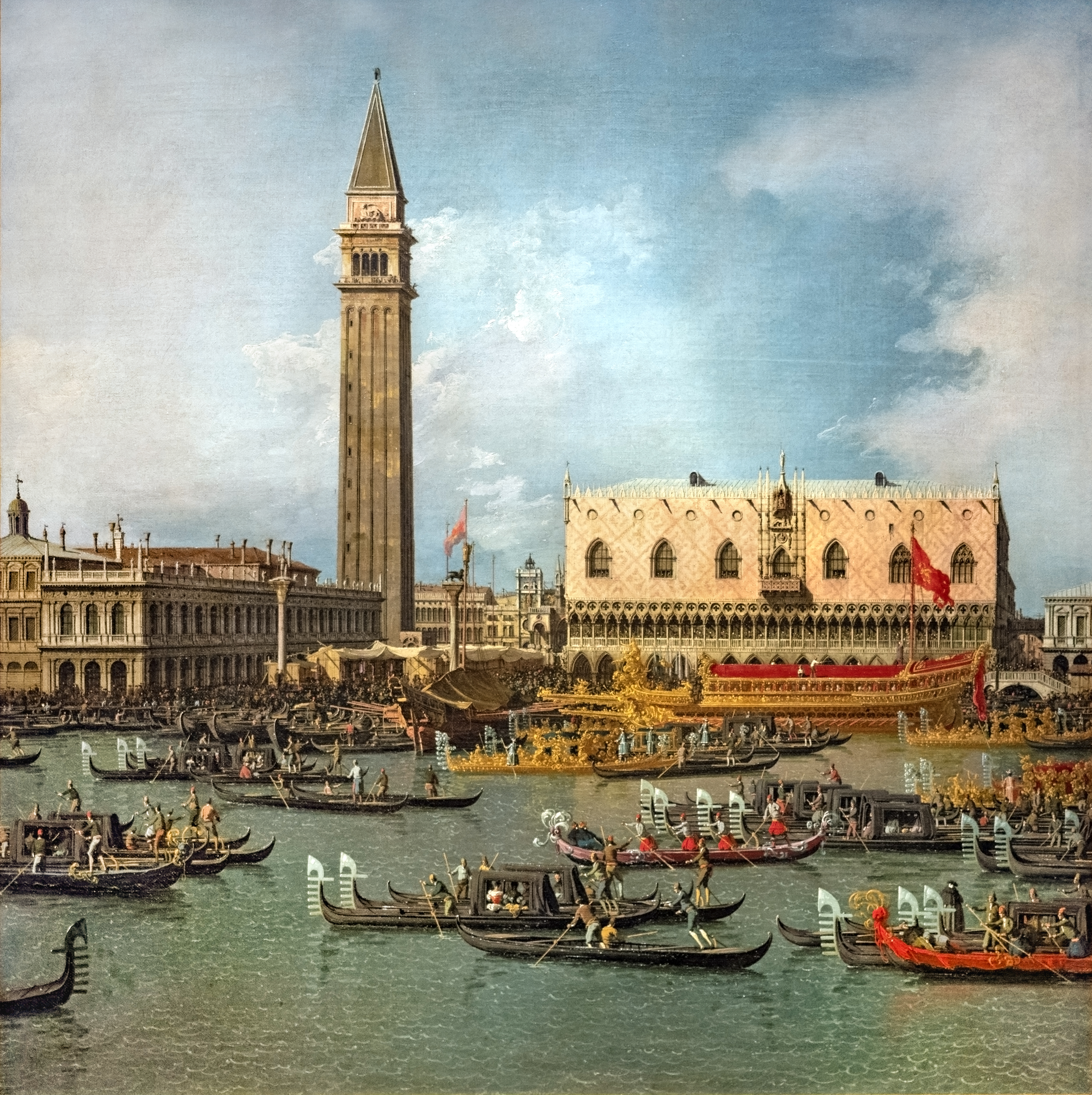
Canaletto, The Bucentaur Returning to the Molo on Ascension Day

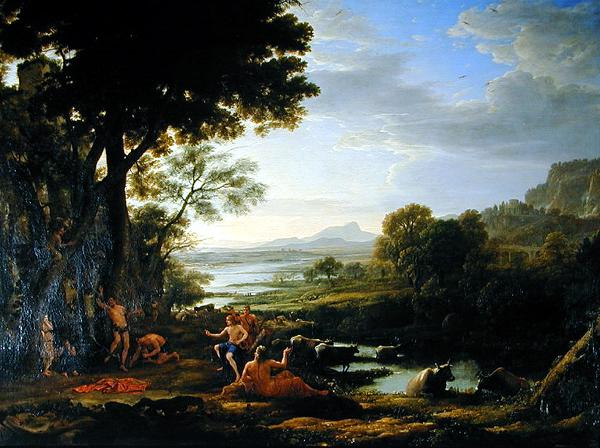
Claude Lorrain, Apollo flaying Marsyas
- The Drawing Room contains eleven paintings: above the fireplace Pietro da Pietri's Madonna in Gloria; two works by Melchior d'Hondecoeter on the upper wall flanking the fireplace of fighting birds (these are allegories on William III of England's wars, each bird representing a European nation); lower left of the fireplace Gaspar Poussin's The Storm; lower right of the fireplace, Claude Lorrain's Apollo flaying Marsyas; above the doors four landscapes by van Bloemen; in the centre of the east wall Jonathan Richardson's portrait of Thomas Coke 1st Earl of Leicester in the robes of the Order of the Bath; and in the centre of the west wall Marcus Gheeraerts the Younger's portrait of Sir Edward Coke, founder of the family's fortune.
- The Saloon contains eight paintings: in the centre of the west wall Rubens' The Return of the Holy Family; in the centre of the east wall van Dyck's Duc D'Arenberg on Horseback (purchased in Paris in 1718 by Thomas Coke on his way back to England from Italy); above the fireplaces two works commissioned by Thomas Coke in Rome, namely, Andrea Procaccini's Tarquin Raping Lucretia and Giuseppe Bartolomeo Chiari's Perseus and Andromeda; above the western doors two paintings by Maratta, Woman Playing a Spinet and Jael Murdering Sisera; and above the eastern doors Agostino Scilla|'s paintings of Summer and Winter.
- The South Dining Room contains eleven paintings: above the fireplace Thomas Gainsborough's portrait of Coke of Norfolk; upper left of the fireplace a Naked Venus in the style of Titian; upper right of the fireplace Hondecoeter's bird painting; lower left and right of the fireplace two works by Gaspar Poussin, A Stormy Landscape and A classical landscape with reclining figures; in the centre of the east wall Reni's Joseph and Potiphar's Wife (acquired by 'Coke of Norfolk' in 1773); above the eastern doors Cristoforo Roncalli's Pope Julius II after Raphael; and Sir Peter Lely's Portrait of Edmund Waller; in the centre of the west wall Batoni's portrait of Coke of Norfolk while on his Grand Tour; above the western doors Sir Thomas More (School of Holbein) and A Venetian Lady (School of Titian).
- The Landscape Room contains 22 paintings. The hang is symmetrical. Luca Giordano's Saint John the Baptist Preaching is the upper painting above the chimneypiece. All the other paintings in the room are landscapes: five works by Gaspar Poussin, seven works by Claude Lorrain including Queen Esther approaching the palace of Ahasuerus, two works by Vernet, one work by Salvator Rosa, two works by Locatelli, two works by Jan Frans van Bloemen, one work by Giovanni Francesco Grimaldi and one work by Domenichino.
- The Green State Bedroom contains five paintings all commissioned by Thomas Coke: above the fireplace Gavin Hamilton's Jupiter caressing Juno and above the four doors paintings by Francesco Zuccarelli depicting the seasons.
- The Green State Dressing Room includes small-scale works by Jacopo Bassano, Sebastiano Conca, Maratta and Gaspar van Wittel.
- The North State Dressing Room: above the chimney piece Bastiano da Sangallo's copy of Michelangelo's destroyed cartoon of Florentines surprised by the Pisans while bathing; Procaccini's The Venerable Lawgiver Numa Pompilius giving law to Rome and Annibale Carracci's Galatea and Polyphemus
- The North State Bedroom: Jonathan Richardson's Portrait of Lady Margaret Tufton, Countess of Leicester & Edward Viscount Coke; Jonathan Richardson's Portrait of Thomas Coke, 1st Earl of Leicester and Portrait of William Heveningham (Thomas Coke's grandfather).
- The Chapel: the east wall above the altar, Guido Reni's The Assumption of the Virgin flanked by Giovanni Battista Cipriani's paintings of St. Anne and St. Cecilia; in the west gallery, Maratta's Virgin Holding a Book and a 16th-century Head of Christ by an unknown painter of the Milanese School; above the fireplace Giorgio Vasari's portrait of Pope Leo X, Bernardino Luini's Holy Family with St John the Baptist, Mazzuola's Penitent Magdalen, and in the manner of van Dyke Archbishop Laud; on the south wall, Preti's The Adoration of the Magi, Andrea Sacchi's Abraham, Hagar and Ishmael, Lanfranco's The Angel appearing to Joseph; on the north wall, Carlo Maratta's The Virgin reading with St. John and Pietro da Cortona's A scriptural piece from the history of Jacob.
- The Classical Library: above the fireplace Trevisani's 1717 portrait of Thomas Coke on his Grand Tour.
- Lady Leicester's Sitting Room: Canaletto's View of the Palace of St Mark, Venice, with preparations for the Doge's Wedding in the overmantel anzd four views of Rome by Gaspar van Wittel.
- The private rooms contain many paintings, including Andrea Casali's portraits of Thomas Coke and his wife and Rosalba Carriera's portraits of Edward, Viscount Coke, and his wife Lady Mary Coke. In 1716 Thomas Coke commissioned Sebastiano Conca's The Elysian Fields, in which Coke is depicted as Orpheus.
- The Guest Wing: Frans Snyders' Parrot, and works by Joshua Reynolds, Anthony van Dyck and Thomas Gainsborough.
- The Kitchen: unusually high up on the east wall is a large early 19th-century portrait of a servant dressed in livery.

== List of principal paintings by school ==
Dutch School

- Hondecoeter, Melchior d' – 3 paintings
- Wittel, Gaspar van – 5 paintings

'English School'

- Lely, Sir Peter – 1 painting
- Gainsborough, Sir Thomas – 2 paintings
- Reynolds, Joshua – 1 painting
- Richardson, Jonathan – 4 paintings

Flemish School

- Bloemen, Jan Frans van – 6 paintings
- Dyck, Anthony van – 2 paintings
- Gheeraerts, Marcus (the Younger) – 1 painting
- Rubens, Peter Paul – 1 painting
- Snyders, Frans – 1 painting

French School

- Dughet, Gaspard (known as Gaspar Poussin) – 8 paintings
- Lorrain, Claude – 8 paintings (including Queen Esther approaching the palace of Ahasuerus)
- Vernet, Claude Joseph – 2 paintings

German School

- Holbein, Hans (the younger) (school of) – 1 painting

Italian School

- Bassano, Jacopo – 1 painting
- Batoni, Pompeo – 1 painting
- Canaletto – 1 painting
- Carracci, Annibale – 1 painting
- Carriera, Rosalba – 2 paintings
- Casali, Andrea – 2 paintings
- Chiari, Giuseppe Bartolomeo – 1 painting
- Cipriani, Giovanni Battista – 2 paintings
- Conca, Sebastiano – 2 paintings
- Cortona, Pietro da – 1 painting
- Giordano, Luca – 1 painting
- Grimaldi, Giovanni Francesco – 1 painting
- Lanfranco, Giovanni – 1 painting
- Locatelli, Andrea – 2 paintings
- Luini, Bernardino – 1 painting
- Maratta, Carlo – 5 paintings
- Parmigianino, (known by Francesco Mazzola) – 1 painting
- Pietri, Pietro da – 1 painting
- Preti, Mattia – 1 painting
- Procaccini, Andrea – 2 paintings
- Reni, Guido – 2 paintings
- Roncalli, Cristoforo – 1 painting (Pope Julius II (after Raphael))
- Rosa, Salvator – 1 painting
- Sacchi, Andrea – 1 painting
- Sangallo, Bastiano da – Florentines surprised by the Pisans while bathing (copy after Michelangelo's destroyed cartoon)
- Scilla, Agostino – 2 paintings
- Titian, (known as Tiziano Vecelli) (style of) – 1 painting
- Titian, (known as Tiziano Vecelli) (school of) – 1 painting
- Trevisani, Francesco – 1 painting
- Vasari, Giorgio – 1 painting
- Zampieri, Domenico – 1 painting
- Zuccarelli, Francesco – 4 overdoor paintings

Scottish School

- Gavin Hamilton – 1 painting

== Old master drawings ==
Sadly most of the old master drawings have been sold, including: Raphael's Cartoon of the Virgin and Child with the Infant St John the Baptist, Bernini's Design for the Tomb of Cardinal Carlo Emanule Pio da Carpi, Pietro da Cortona's Christ on the Cross and Assembly of the Gods, Nicolas Poussin's View of the Tiber Valley and Wooded Landscape with River God Gathering Fruit, Guido Reni's Head of a Young Woman Looking Up, Jusepe de Ribera Adoration of the Shepherds, Frans Snyders Wild Boar at Bay, Paolo Veronese's Allegorical Female Figure Holding a Sceptre & Globe.

== Books and manuscripts ==
Thomas Coke had purchased many books and manuscripts while on his Grand Tour, though he continued to purchase items after the Tour ended. In 1719 he bought the Codex Leicester, in 1721 several Greek manuscripts acquired via Consul Joseph Smith in Venice. He employed a Neapolitan called Domenico Ferrari as his librarian at Holkham on a salary of £100 per annum. He would purchase all the significant books on architecture published in England including, Giacomo Leoni's English translation of Palladio's books and Colen Campbell's Vitruvius Britannicus. Other architectural books include Leone Battista Alberti's De re aedificatoria (1452, Ten Books of Architecture) of which both an Italian edition of 1565 and an English edition of 1726 are to be found in the library as is Antoine Desgodetz's Les edifices antiques de Rome dessinés et mesurés très exactement (Paris 1682). Other interests of Coke covered were politics and music.

An extensive archive of material relating to the building of the house and the acquisition of the collections exists including letters from both Matthew Brettingham the elder, the executive architect and Baron Lovell (Thomas Coke's title before becoming Earl of Leicester), as well as several architectural plans and elevations showing various alternative designs including many drawings by William Kent. In 1761 Matthew Brettingham the elder published The Plans, Elevations and Sections, Of Holkham in Norfolk in which he down played the role of Kent in the design of the House. The 2nd edition of 1773 by Brettingham the Younger corrected the first edition and gave due weight to Lord Burlington's and Kent's roles in the design process. The correspondence with Matthew Brettingham the younger whilst he was in Italy is extensive, there was much discussion about potential purchases of art works, their cost, shipping and custom fees, also his account book survives with detailed entries for each art work purchased.

- The Long Library: Contains 2,000 of the 10,500 books & manuscripts bought by Thomas Coke although 'Coke of Norfolk' also acquired several volumes when on his Grand Tour. All are bound in leather with gilt titles (the collection has around 15,000 books in total some of which are modern). The core of the library are books from and on Italy, especially the Renaissance.
- The North Tribune: which houses around 300 of the largest books in the collection, elephant folio volumes which include architectural books of which the collection has several examples, including Italian editions of I Quattro Libri dell'Architettura.
- The Classical Library: There are 700 titles, of which 209 are incunabula. Holkham Manuscript 311 is an illuminated manuscript of Virgil's Aeneid dated c1500 just one of many still in the collection. Many manuscripts have been sold from the collection including Holkham Manuscript 48 Dante's Divine Comedy, Italian 14th century, now in the Bodleian Library.
- The Manuscript Library: Contains 558 literary, theological and legal manuscripts, dating from the 12th to 18th centuries. Including some that once belonged to Sir Edward Coke's, including ones related to the settlement of North America, Coke helped draft the charter of the Virginia Company. Other of his legal documents includes a 15th-century copy of Magna Carta. There is also a collection of Civil War and Commonwealth pamphlets.
- Additionally there is extensive book shelving in the attics.

== The design of Holkham Hall ==
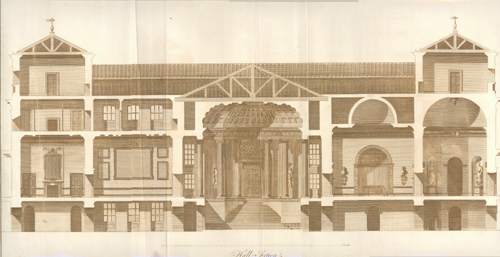
Section through northern rooms

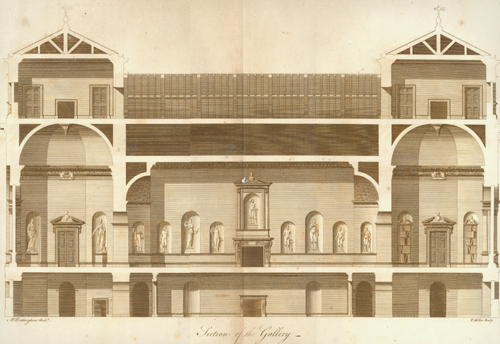
Section through Statue Gallery

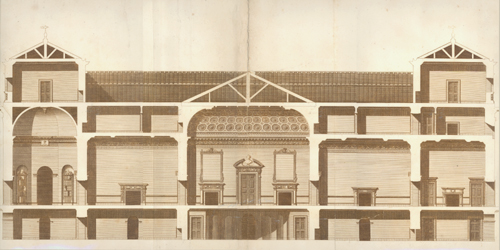
Section through southern rooms

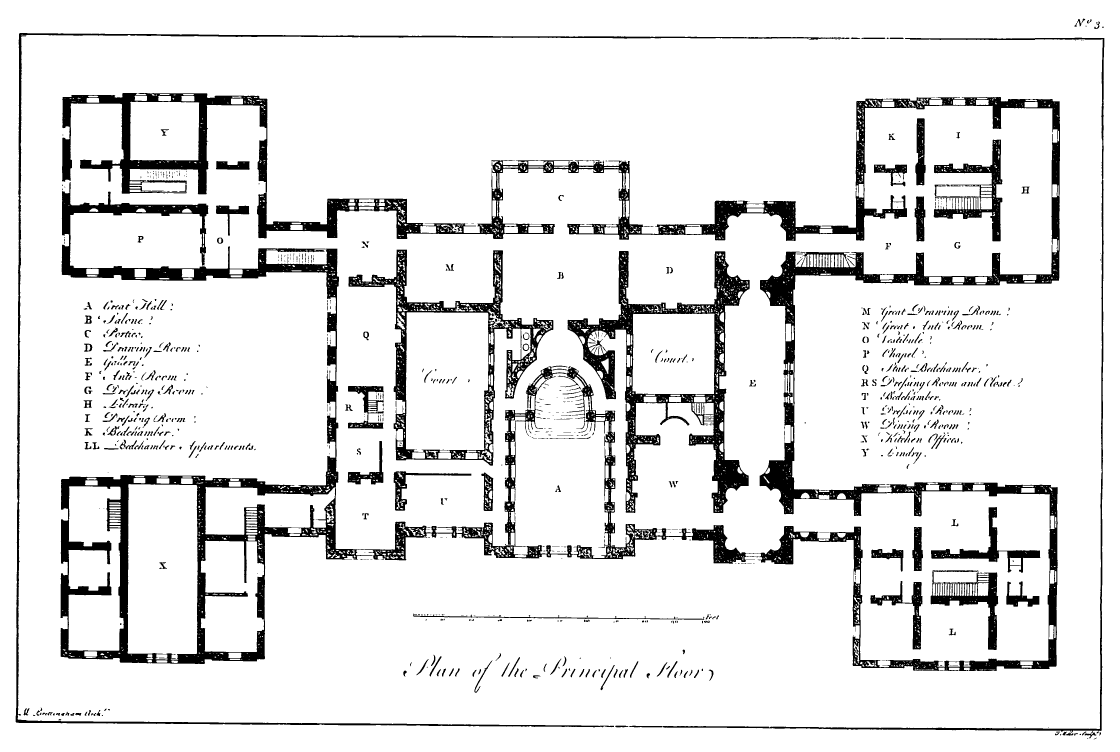
Plan of the piano nobile

When the idea of building Holkham Hall as it is seen today occurred is not known. It may have been during his grand tour that the idea first emerged, Coke had met William Kent in early 1714 and then Richard Boyle the 3rd Earl of Burlington later that same year. Later they went travelling through Italy and experienced Andrea Palladio's architecture first hand, particularly his villas in the Veneto. Palladio's I Quattro Libri dell'Architettura (The Four Books of Architecture) sets out the theories that underlie his designs and includes an extensive series of woodcut illustrations. These villas formed the basis of the design, though reinterpreted as the centre of an English country estate rather than a summer retreat from Venice, that included working farm buildings. Whereas in a Palladio villa the family would have lived in the Corp de Logis the wings being reserved for agricultural use, at Holkham the State Rooms housing the finest works of art occupy the centre of the House the wings being used for daily life and service functions. In 1773 Matthew Brettingham the younger published a new edition of his father's book The Plans, Elevations and Sections of Holkham with additional text in which it is stated that the concept of a central corp de logis with wings was taken from Palladio's unfinished Villa of Trissino at Meledo but that another of the architect's unbuilt designs Villa Mocenigo on the Brenta was the model for four wings. Brettingham also stated that Lord Leicester found the design with curved colonnades wasteful and adopted the current short corridor links. One of the subjects covered in Palladio's writings are the ratios of room dimensions, this is seen in the House where the ratios of 1:1 occur in the Landscape room and the North Dining room both square, 3:1 is seen in the Long Library, 2:3 in the South Dining room and Drawing Room, 3:4 in Lady Leicester's Sitting Room and the Venetian Room and 1:1.41 (the square root of two) in the Saloon.

There were several major influences on the interior decoration of the house including Inigo Jones's designs. Burlington had purchased Jones's surviving architectural drawings in 1720. These were then published in 1727 in the two folio volumes of The Designs of Inigo Jones by William Kent. Ceilings divided up by deep plaster beams that are found throughout Holkham are in the style of Jones, who designed ceilings like these for the Queen's House. Other features showing the influence of Jones's designs include many of the door surrounds, fireplaces such as those in the Drawing Room that are massively sculptural and the decorative niche above the Statue Gallery fireplace.

Antoine Desgodetz's publication Les edifices antiques de Rome dessinés et mesurés très exactement (Paris 1682) with its engravings of the monuments and antiquities of Rome, provided suitable architectural details based on illustrations in this book for rooms including: The Marble Hall the columns of which are based on those of the Temple of Fortuna Virilis the coffering is based on the Pantheon, The Statue Gallery exedra are based on those at the Temple of Venus and Roma, in the Saloon the coffering of the cove is copied from the Basilica of Maxentius and the ceiling frieze in the Drawing Room is from the Temple of Antoninus and Faustina. Daniele Barbaro's translation with extended commentary of the De architectura (Ten books of Architecture) by Vitruvius, contains a woodcut interpretation of a plan of Vitruvius's Roman House and was in part the inspiration for the Marble Hall, especially the atrium which is shown flanked by six columns and with a coffered ceiling. Matthew Brettingham the younger stated that the concept for the Marble Hall was Lord Leicester's, inspired by "Palladio's example of a Basilica, or tribunal of justice, exhibited in his designs for Monsignor Barbaro's translation of Vitruvius".

Between 1725 and 1731, William Kent had been at work designing interiors at nearby Houghton Hall, prior to the building of Holkham this was the grandest Palladian style house in Britain and was also built to house an extensive collection of paintings. The earliest surviving elevations and plans for Holkham are preserved in the British Library and date from the 1720s, for which a payment of 10 guineas was made to Matthew Brettingham the Elder in 1726, these show a house heavily influenced by Houghton, but without any wings, the Marble Hall is as designed by Kent prior to the changes of 1755, plus the Statue Gallery is in a form close to that built. The first design to show the four wings is by Kent dated 1728. An influence on the finished House is Chiswick House designed by Lord Burlington and with interiors by William Kent, the gallery being the basis of the design of the Statue Gallery at Holkham.

=== Influence of the design ===
The building most influenced by Holkham is Kedleston Hall, the first architect of which was Matthew Brettingham the Elder, who probably designed the entrance hall, the house was to have four wings, though only the two northern were built. The portico leads to grand entrance hall with its 25 feet (7.6 m) high alabaster Corinthian columns. The interiors at Holkham were the culmination of designs based on Roman public buildings and temples, even before they were completed they were old fashioned. Robert Adam had returned from his grand tour in 1758. His interiors are some of the earliest Neo-classical designs influenced by the newly discovered Roman domestic interiors at Pompeii which are all together lighter in style. He designed the state rooms at Kedleston and lightened the design of the entrance hall. This was the future of domestic design, the grand style of Holkham would never be repeated in a British House. Although Palladio would remain a major influence in British architecture, never again would a great house be built that was so closely influenced by the Italian's designs and theories.

== Furnishings and decoration ==
=== Chronology of the construction and decoration of Holkham Hall ===
The extensive archives at Holkham list all the materials that went into building the house, their cost and the names of craftsmen employed. Annual expenditure varied between £500 and £2,500, but peaked at £6,500 in 1755 and fell to £1,200 in 1759. The chronology of the building is as follows:

- 1707 – Thomas Coke aged ten inherits the estate on the death of his father.
- 1712–18 – Begins acquiring works of art during the Grand Tour.
- 1718 – Marries Lady Margaret Turton.
- 1722 – Thomas Coke makes a loss of £37,928, 14s. 8d. in the South Sea Bubble seriously delaying construction work.
- 1726 – First designs for the House produced.
- 1728 – Thomas Coke granted title of Baron Lovel.
- 1729 – Landscaping of the Park to William Kent's designs commences.
- 1730 – Obelisk half a mile south and on axis with the house erected.
- 1734 – 4 May foundation of Family Wing laid.
- 1738–41 – Family wing completed, decoration designed by William Kent who was paid £50 for his services. Carving of door friezes and chimneypieces by Mr Marsden. Furniture made by William Bradshaw and Benjamin Goodison.
- 1740 – October foundations of Corp de Logis commenced. December Joseph Pickford of Derby (uncle of the architect Joseph Pickford) was paid for chimneypieces.
- 1741 – Gilding and Painting in the family wing, Benjamin Carter provided chimneypiece for 'My Lady's Closet'.
- 1742 – Statues set up temporarily in wing.
- 1743 – Foundation stone for main house acquired.
- 1744 – Timber acquired. A mason Joseph Howell searching for suitable stone in Yorkshire. Bricklayers and carpenters assembled. Thomas Coke granted title of Earl of Leicester.
- 1747–54 – Matthew Brettingham the Younger in Italy buying art works. Bath & Portland stone acquired.
- 1748 – William Kent dies.
- 1753 – The Statue Gallery and North Dining Room glazed. The wood carver and joiner James Lillie at work as is the plasterer Thomas Clark. The Earl of Burlington dies.
- 1754 – Purbeck marble and paving stones delivered. The staircase in the Chapel Wing built. Statues and Pictures being installed in the Corp de Logis. Benjamin Carter's chimneypieces are installed in the Saloon.
- 1755 – Alabaster from Castlehay arrives. Benjamin Carter and Joseph Pickford carving chimneypieces. The decision was made to alter William Kent's design for the Marble Hall, the plan to place the statue of Jupiter in the centre of the staircase is abandoned as are the planned fireplaces, these are replaced by a heated floor, also it was decided to have a wrought iron balustrade instead of a stone one and the order of the columns is changed from Corinthian to Ionic, the columns were also originally going to continue along the north wall leaving the ground floor as a square, the wall to support them had been built.
- 1756 – More alabaster delivered. Statue niches in the Marble Hall being created. Alabaster columns and sculptures being delivered. The Kitchen wing completed and in use.
- 1757 – John Neale gilding rooms including the bookcases in the South Tribune. James Lillie carving models for sofas and chairs. Clark continues plastering. The old house being demolished to make way for the Guest Wing. The white marble Ionic capitals for the Marble Hall begin to be delivered. The bricklayer John Elliott is modifying the Marble Hall to the revised design of 1755.
- 1758–9 – Floor behind columns in Marble Hall being laid. Lillie continues carving. William Townson is fabricating the mahogany doors for the Marble Hall and William Atkinson is carving the alabaster door surrounds.
- 1759 – The Earl of Leicester Thomas Coke dies on 20 April. Matthew Brettingham the Elder is sacked as executive architect and replaced by the carver James Miller who designs the Chapel and Interiors of the Guest Wing.
- 1760 – Timber acquired for Chapel ceiling. The plasterwork by Thomas Clark in the Marble Hall completed.
- 1761 – Wrought iron balustrade in Marble Hall forged and installed probably by Thomas Tilston. The Birmingham locksmith Thomas Blockley was paid for providing locks, bolts, hinges and screws £110. 5s. 0d..
- 1764 – The chapel is plastered by Thomas Clark, while Robert May and Peter Moor carve mahogany doors and the cedar screen and altar rails.
- 1765 – Building of the House complete, workmen dismissed.
- 1769 – Matthew Brettingham the Elder dies.
- 1771 – Lady Leicester pays the final installment for the furniture.
- 1773 – The final works of art are installed, purchased by the heir to Holkham 'Coke of Norfolk' on his Grand Tour.

The total amount spent on building and decorating the House was nearly £90,000. with a further £8562. 3s. 5d. spent on furnishings. Including £3,166. 16s. 0d. on damask, velvet and other textiles from a London mercer called Carr. Between 1734 and 1762, 2,700,000 yellow bricks were manufactured at Burnham Market at £1 per thousand bricks.

=== Description of the major interiors ===
The Corp de Logis

- The Marble Hall: This is the grandest and most complex room in the House. Rising the full height of the house the room is nearly 50 feet (15 m) high, the main body being 46 feet (14 m) square, at the upper floor level taking up most of the south wall is a large apse, which in turn has a coffered-exedra in its centre. The ground floor is a rectangle, it being surrounded by walls to the east, west and south sides, which support a Colonnade of eighteen full columns and two matching pilasters on the north wall 20 feet (6.1 m) high of the Ionic order, which in turn are surrounded by a passageway. There are six columns down each flank of the room, with two more at the end, the remaining four columns follow the curve of the apse. The apse contains a wide flight of white marble steps that rises to the upper level at the southernmost columns. The columns have an extremely rich plaster entablature, the soffit has richly decorated plaster panels edged in egg and dart, the frieze has bucrania and putti between festoons of fruit, the cornice in turn supports the deep coffered cove of the ceiling that rises to the flat centre over both the apse and the main part of the room, which is enriched with molded plaster beams also richly decorated with rosettes and other decoration. The fluted columns are of pink-veined Derbyshire alabaster, with white marble capitals. The walls surrounding the ground floor are also faced in the same alabaster, there are two arched doorways at the northern end of the walls leading to the service areas. These walls have a skirting of black marble decorated with a white marble meander, there is also a band of black marble decorated with a white marble scroll pattern just below the bases of the columns. The floor is white marble edged with grey marble. Between the columns is an elaborate black painted s-scroll wrought iron balustrade, supporting a mahogany hand rail. The upper corridor behind the columns is more restrained in its decoration, the alabaster is restricted to the skirting and door frames, with a white marble floor, the flat ceilings having simple large coffers between each column, separated by a rich band of guilloché patterned plasterwork, the walls like the ceiling being white plaster. The east and west walls of the upper level have four plain statue niches alternating with three doors, the southern apse is flanked by doors with windows above, then within the apse are two more statue niches flanking the central exedra with its hexagonal coffering, this contains two more statue niches flanking the doorway into the Saloon with its alabaster door surround with rich entablature and brackets, these like all the doors in the state rooms are of panelled mahogany. All the statue niches are semicircular in plan and rise from dado level to a half domed termination. The northern wall continues the alabaster and marble decoration across the ground floor, above is a Venetian window framed in white plaster, consisting of Corinthian pilasters and matching entablature, this is flanked by two sash windows. Beneath the central window is the main entrance which is flanked by black marble Ionic engaged-columns, supporting an alabaster pediment in the frieze of which is this inscription:

THIS SEAT, on an open barren Estate
Was planned, planted, built, decorated.
And inhabited the middle of the XVIIIth Century
By THO's COKE EARL of LEICESTER

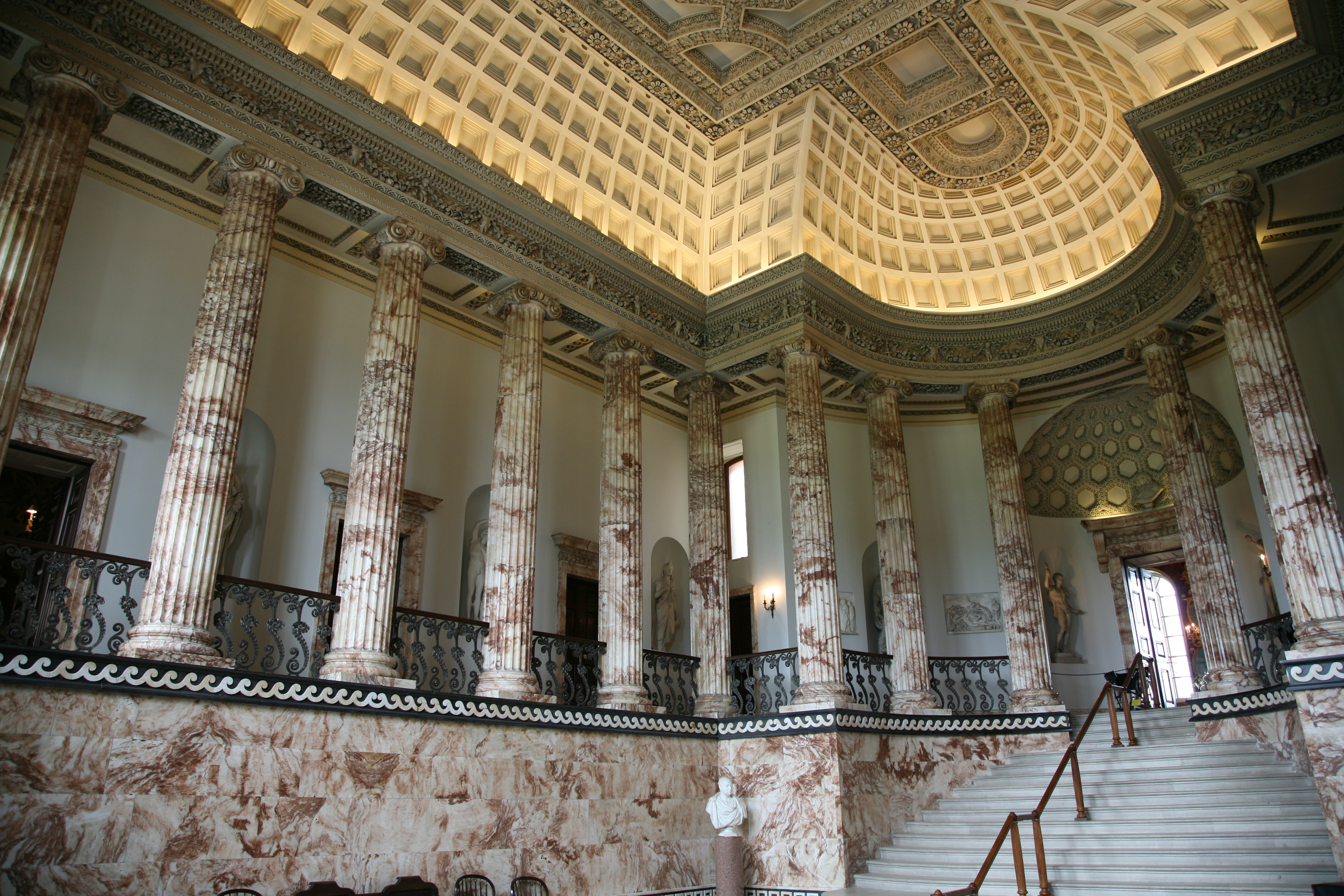
The Marble Hall, looking south

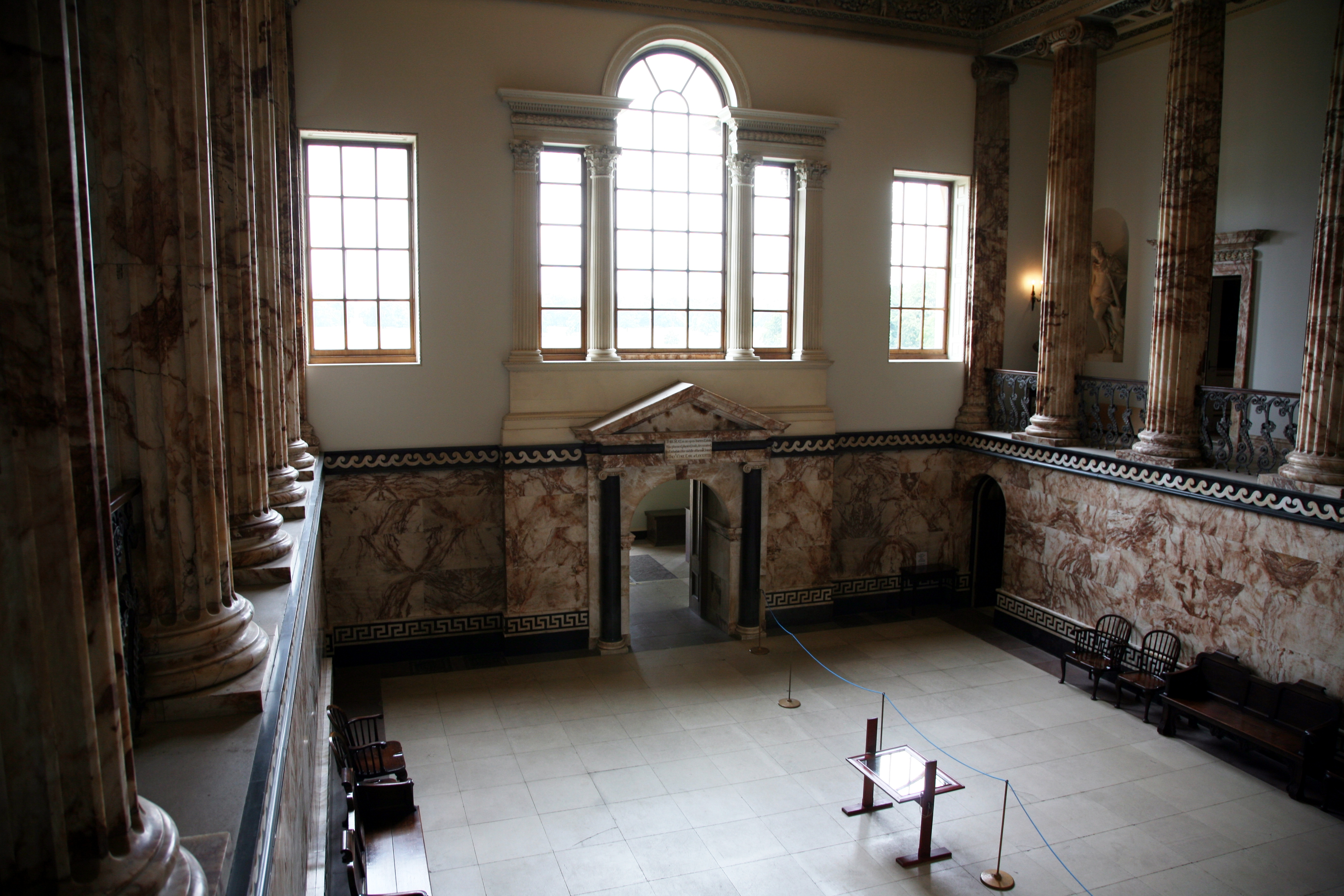
The Marble Hall, looking north

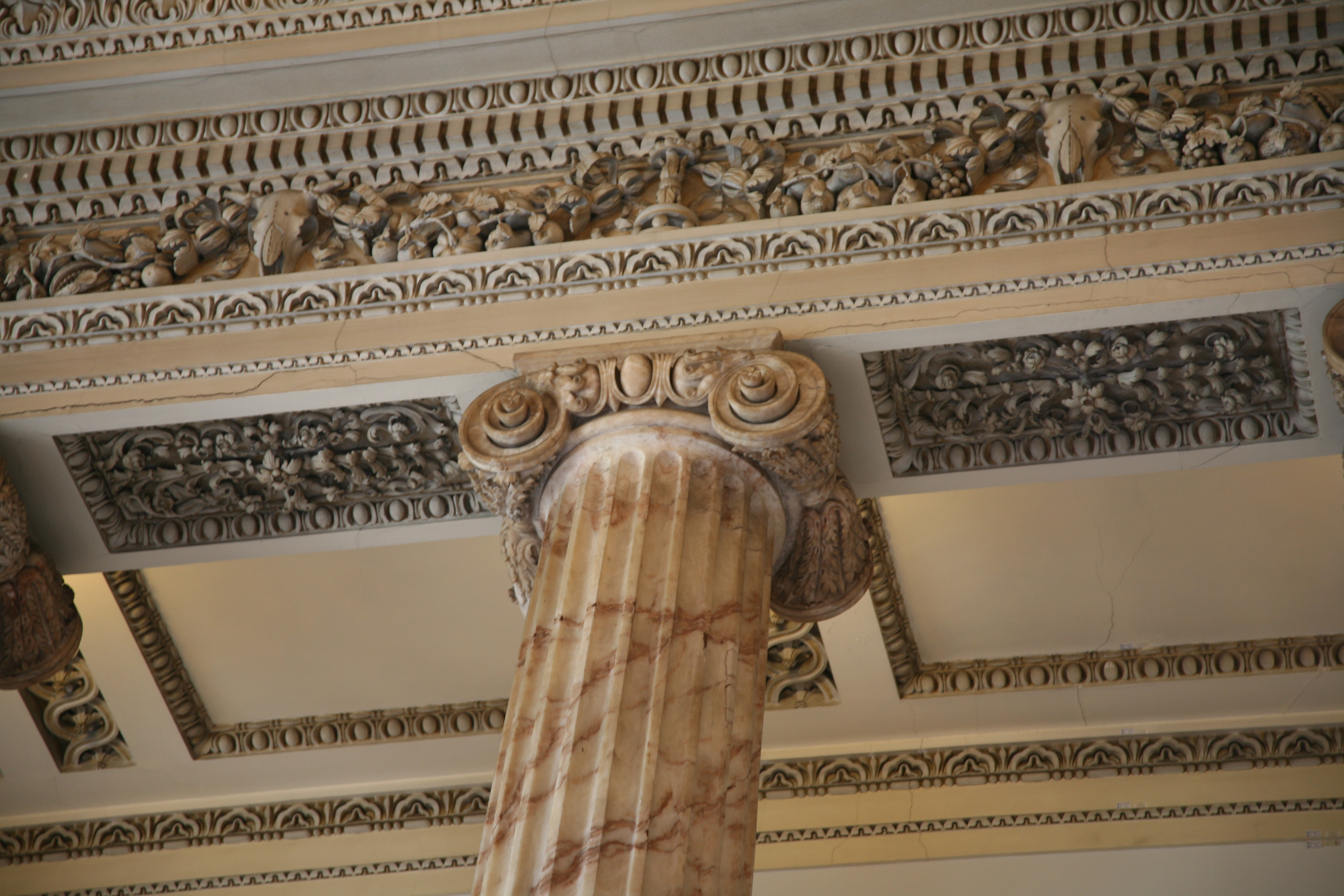
Detail of column capital and entablature, Marble Hall

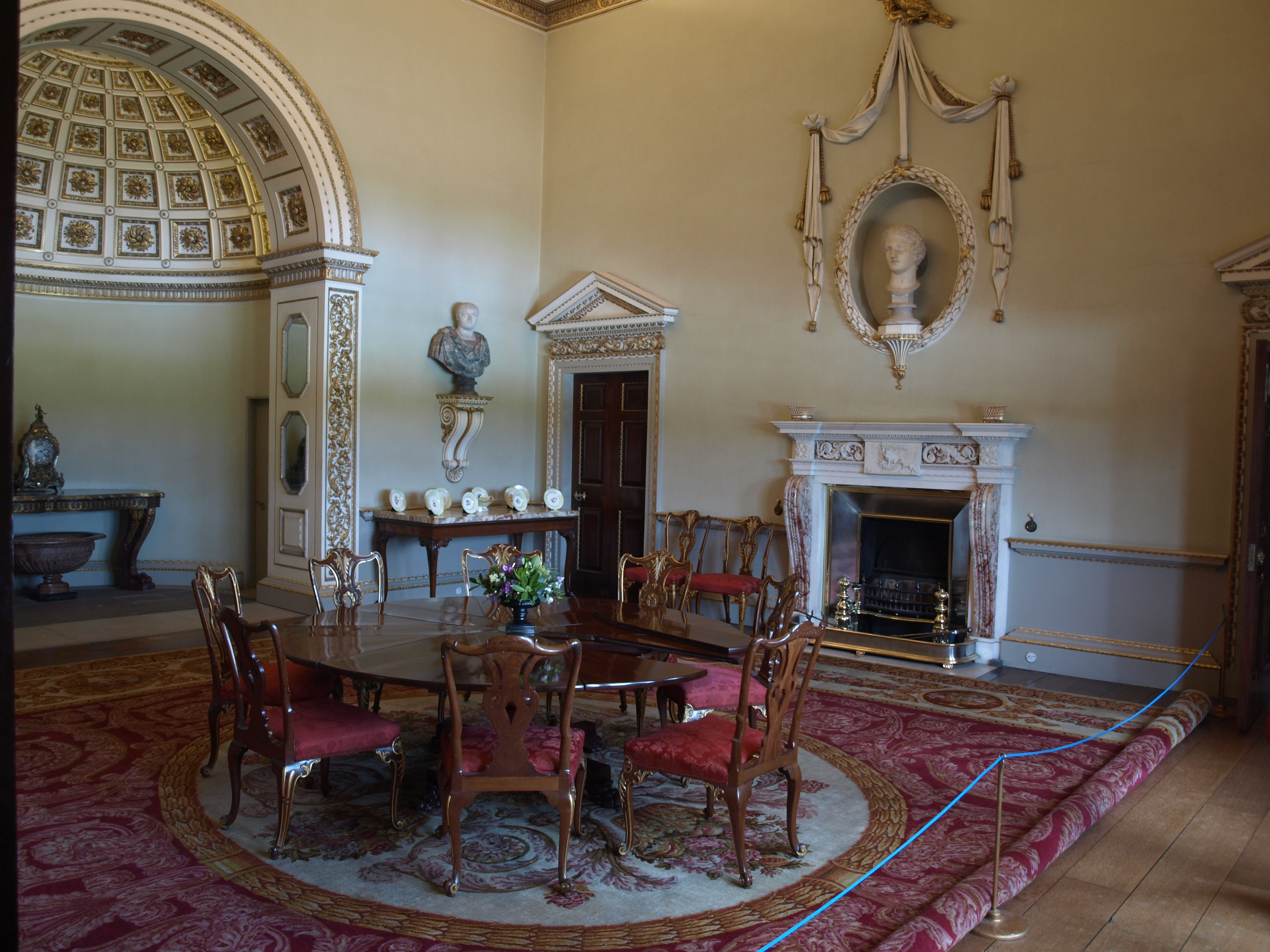
The North Dining Room

- The North Dining Room: Is a cube of 27 feet (8.2 m) a side, with a large apse in the middle of the south wall, this is richly coffered, and flanked by pilasters with richly carved rinceaux and mirrored panelling on their side facing the apse. Within the apse just behind the pilasters are two doors leading to a staircase that links to the service areas and kitchen. The two fireplaces are carved from Sicilian Jasper & white marble, with reliefs from Aesop's Fables, the eastern fireplace with The Bear and the Bee-Hive and the western The Sow and the Wolf, were carved by Thomas Carter, above are oval niches surrounded by plaster swags held in the talons of gilt plaster eagles. The ceiling has a small cove above a cornice, the edge of the ceiling proper being edged by a plaster beam that enclose a circular plaster beam both decorated with rinceaux, the centre of the ceiling is a shallow dome. The four doors that flank the fireplaces have pediments. The Venetian window is framed by Corinthian pilasters and columns. A large classical style porphyry table from Italy is in the centre of the apse, the curve of which follows that of the apse, with a red granite wine-cooler, two marble top tables flank the apse above which are brackets to support a bust. There is an elaborate silver candelabra over three feet in height in the centre of the circular dining table, the dining chairs are mahogany originally the sets were of red leather and the richly patterned and coloured Axminster carpet mirrors the form of the ceiling dome and plaster beams. The room is white with some gilding. An early 18th-century bracket clock sits in the centre of the porphyry table.
- The Statue Gallery: Is a tripartite room 105 feet (32 m) long by 20 feet (6.1 m) wide, consisting of two plain-domed octagonal tribunes 32 feet (9.8 m) high with elaborate entablatures and are linked by arches to the coffered-exedras at either end of the rectangular central room that is 24 feet (7.3 m) high and 46 feet (14 m) long, 58 feet (18 m) including the exedra. The Northern Tribune has large niches in the form of exedras in the corners that extent down to floor level to take large sculptures on plinths, there are busts in the open pediments above the two doors. The Southern Tribune has bookcases in the corners with swan-neck pediments, which like the doors take busts, above the window flanked by Corinthian pilasters, in plaster is the year 1753. The statue niches in the central room rise from dado level, two in each of the exedras and three either side of the fireplace the central one of which is larger than the flanking ones. The elaborately carved chimneypiece carved by Joseph Pickford is of white marble with coloured panel, is surmounted by a niche with a carved pedimented frame, all the other niches are plain. The busts sit on brackets projecting from the walls, the central Palladian window is framed by elaborate Corinthian columns and pilasters, the room has a gilt cornice around the plain ceiling. The walls are painted a very pale grey, with the ceiling, dado, window surrounds and niche over the fireplace white with gilt highlights. In the tribunes hanging from plaster pendants are two cut-glass crystal chandeliers, English dated c1760. In the central room are two chandeliers of gilt bronze, there are two side tables between the windows, that have richly veined marble tops, the frames richly carved and gilt. On the tables are two matching marble urns. Flanking the chimneypiece are sofas flanked by matching chairs of parcel-gilt wood with dark blue leather upholstery made by Saunders in 1757.

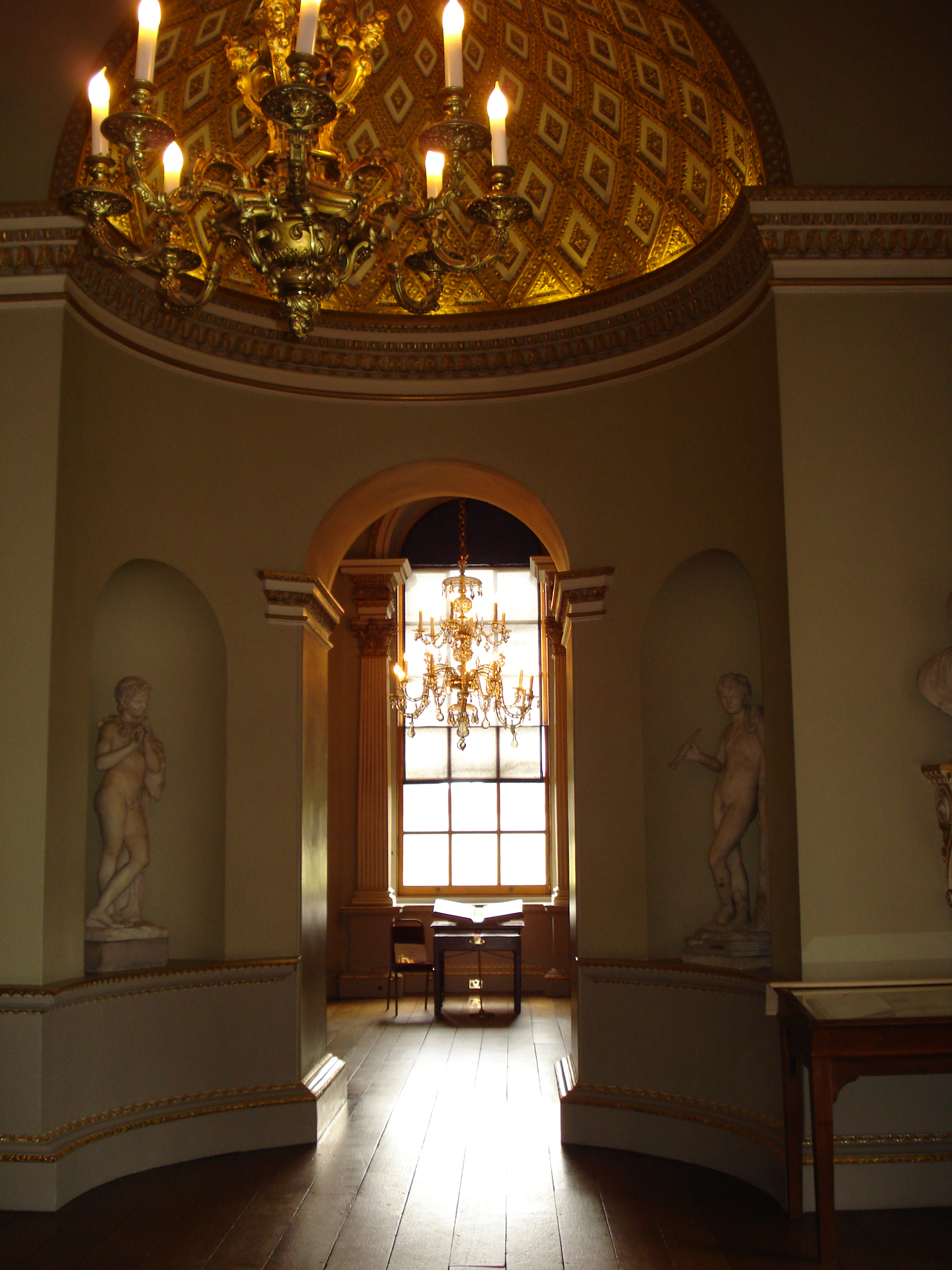
The Southern Exedra the Statue Gallery

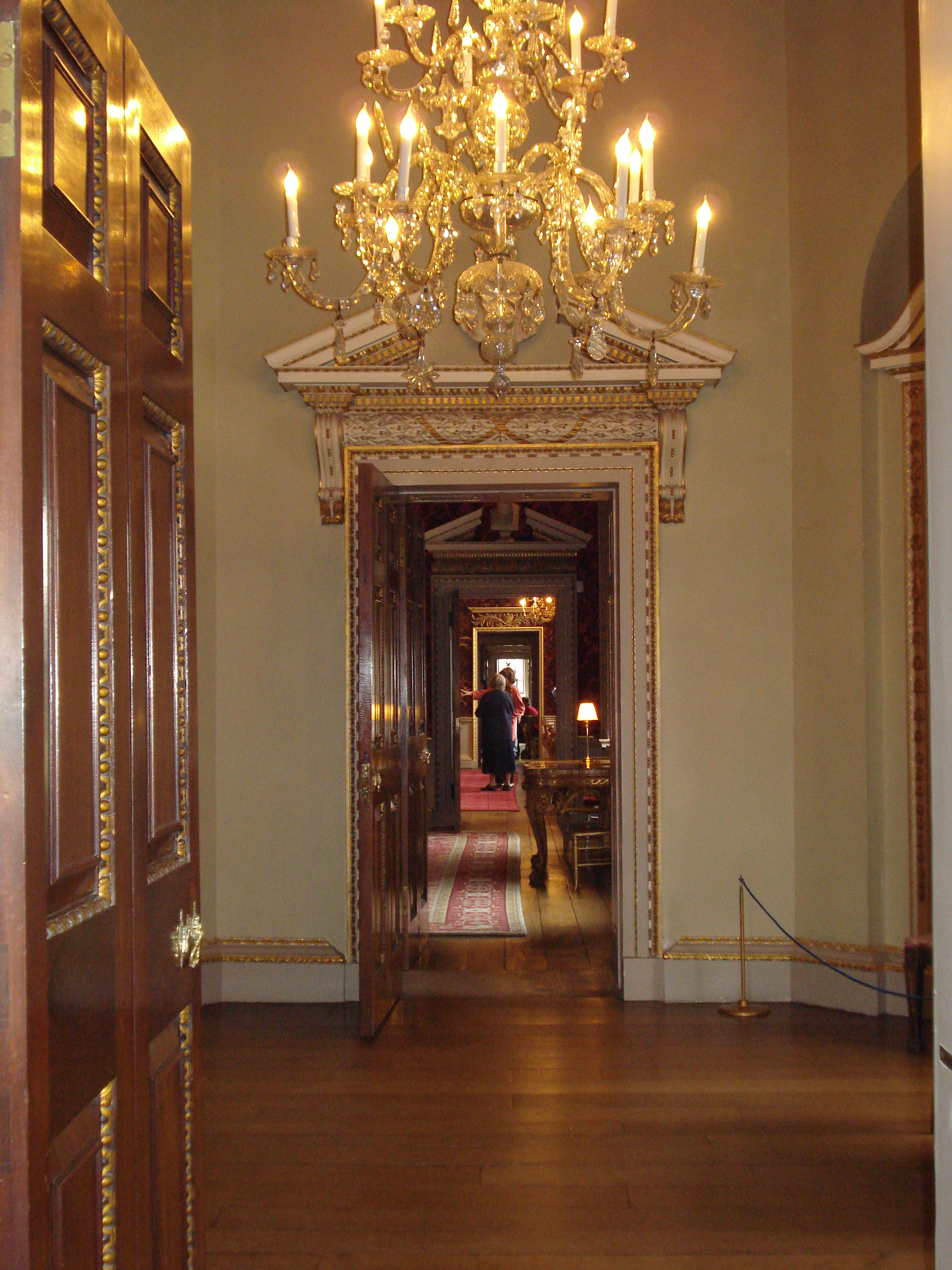
Looking through the southern tribune of the Statue Gallery along the southern enfilade

- The Drawing Room: Is 20 by 30 feet (9.1 m), the fireplace of white marble was richly carved by Joseph Pickford, the frieze of which has two swags of fruit either side of a plain cartouche, the walls are covered in patterned red velvet, the plaster ceiling divided into nine rectangular compartments, divided by plaster beams richly decorated with foliage and masks where the beams cross, it has a rich entablature the frieze decorated with standing griffins between foliage. The four doors on the side walls have open pediments. The dado, ceiling and door surrounds are white highlighted in gilt. The seat furniture is designed by William Kent, an upholstered in red patterned velvet there are sofas each side of the chimneypiece and arm-chairs on each side wall flanking tables, there is a fine carved and gilt pier glass between the windows carved by James Millar, below which is carved gilt pier-table with marble top.

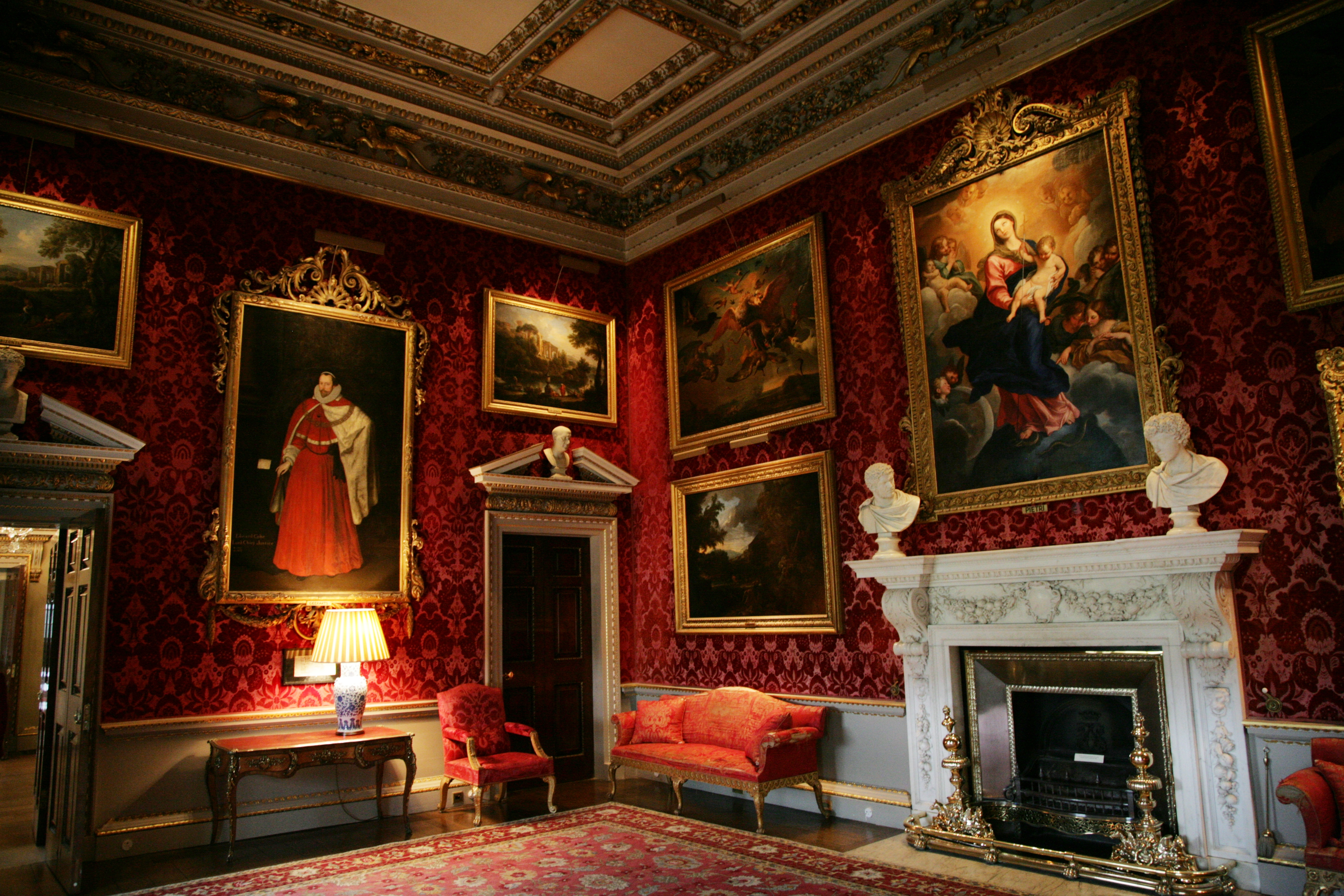
The Drawing Room

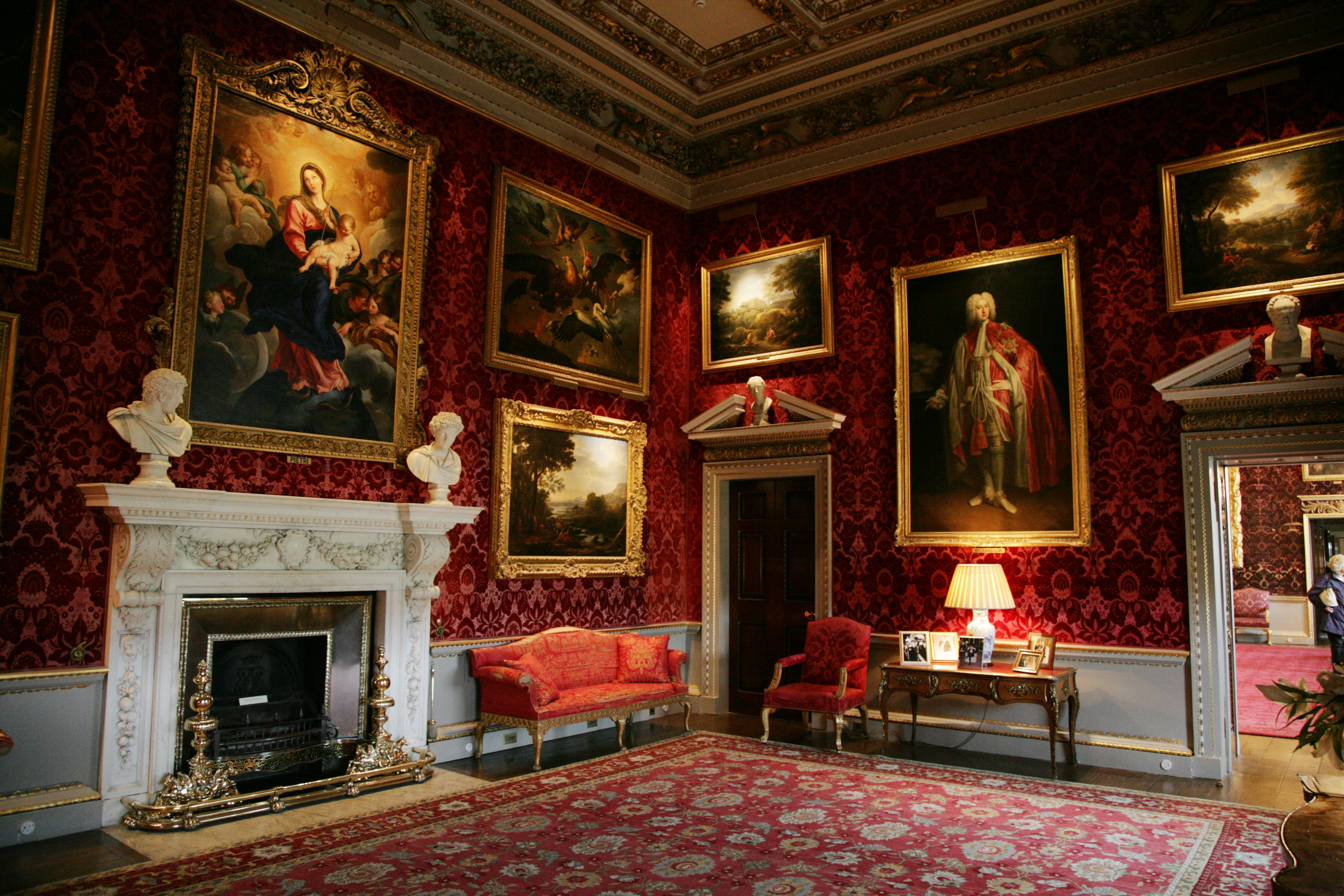
The Drawing Room

- The Saloon: Is 28 by 40 feet (12 m). The ceiling has a rich entablature, the frieze of which is of rinceaux of acanthus leaves, with a small family coat of arms flanked by ostrich and a dragon in the centre of each wall, this supports the deep octagonal coffered-cove, each coffer containing a rosette, rising to 32 feet (9.8 m) in height to the flat area of the ceiling, also coffered but with a mixture of octagonal, hexagonal and square coffers. On the north wall are two fireplaces the work of Benjamin Carter, of white marble with Sicilian marble Ionic columns and Frieze with carvings in white marble including central plaques of Cybele with a lion and a personification of astronomy, which flank the large central door, the frame being richly carved, including acanthus foliage in the frieze and surmounted with a segmental open pediment. The four doors at the ends of the side walls are surmounted by an Earl's coronet above two crossed palm branches. The walls are clad in red patterned Genoa caffoy, the dado, ceiling and door cases are white with gilt highlights. In the middle of the east and west walls are William Kent side tables, whose supports are carved eagles (probably the work of Matthias Lock) and their tops are covered by geometrical mosaics dated 123–125 AD from Hadrian's Villa. Between the five windows are four sets of mirrors with elaborately carved & gilt frames consisting of two oval mirrors with a girandole between and matching marble topped pier-tables below, . The seat furniture gilt and red velvet upholstered, to match the walls, is by William Kent. There are four gilt wood torchieres flanking the fireplaces.
- The South Dining Room: Is 20 by 30 feet (9.1 m), the fireplace is of white marble with an inlaid panel of Lapis Lazuli and richly carved boys heads beneath large corbels, the walls are covered in patterned red velvet, the plaster ceiling divided into nine compartments the central one enclosing an oval, divided by plaster beams richly decorated with vine leaves and masks where the beams cross, has a rich entablature the frieze decorated with seated griffins. The four doors on the side walls have open pediments. The dado, ceiling and door surrounds are white highlighted in gilt. The seat furniture is designed by William Kent, an upholstered in red patterned velvet there are sofas each side of the chimneypiece and on each side wall, there is a fine gilt pier glass between the windows probably carved by James Whittle, below which is carved gilt pier-table with marble top of giallo antico.
- The Landscape Room: Is 20 feet (6.1 m) square, the fireplace is of white marble with inlaid panels of coloured marble, the walls are covered in patterned red Damask, the plaster ceiling is divided into nine compartments the central one an octagon, divided by plaster beams decorated with a guilloché pattern with rosettes where the beams cross. The four doors, flanking the fireplace and in the centres of the east and west walls have entablatures. There is a Venetian window with Corinthian columns and pilasters. The dado, ceiling and door surrounds are white highlighted in gilt. The furniture consists of a small desk and two carved gilt, two seater sofas upholstered in red velvet and a pair of torchieres flank the fireplace.
- The Green State Bedroom: Is 32 by 20 feet (6.1 m), the fireplace is of white marble including two Caryatids at the corners and a carved plaque in the centre backed by yellow marble with black veins. The ceiling

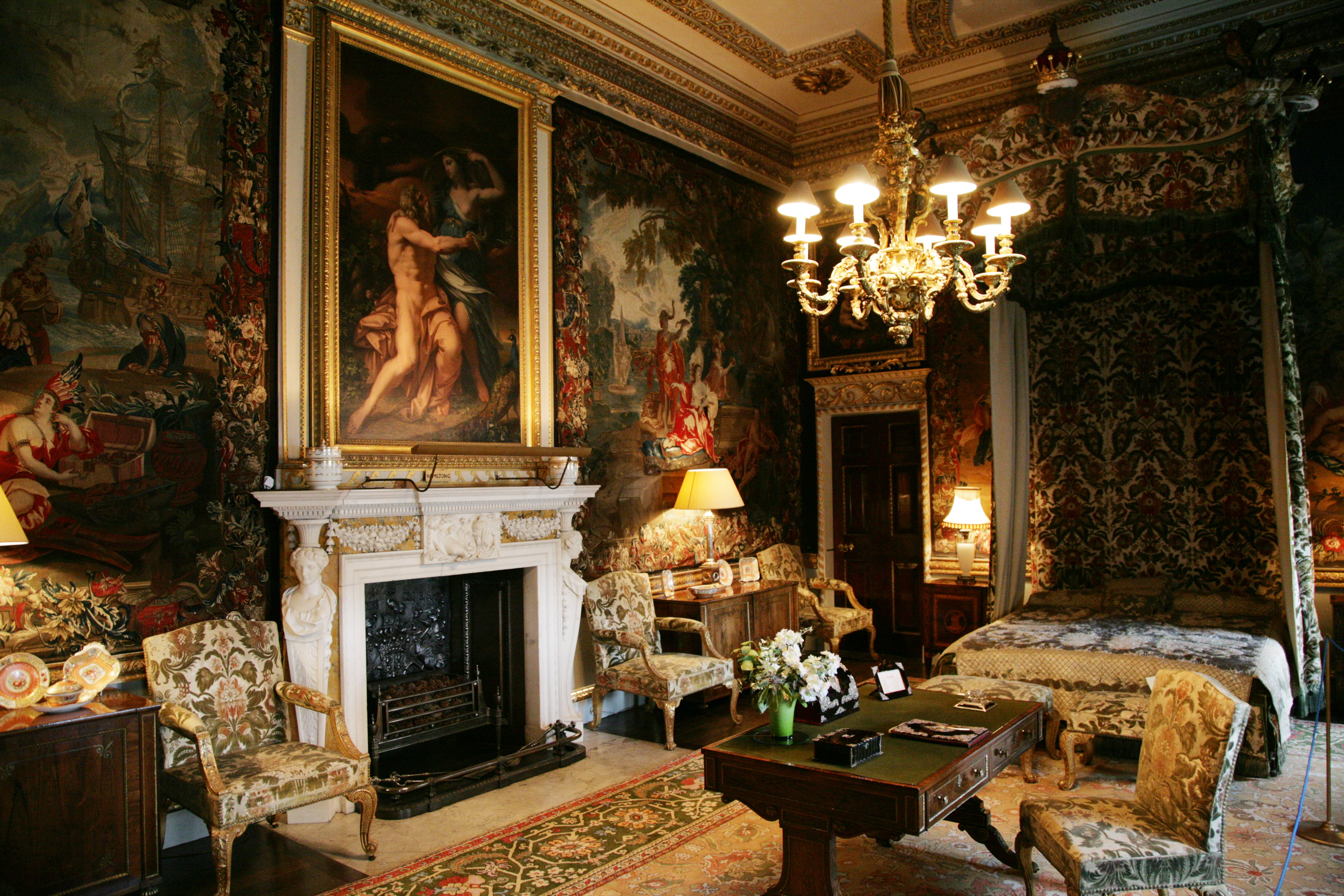
The Green State Bedroom

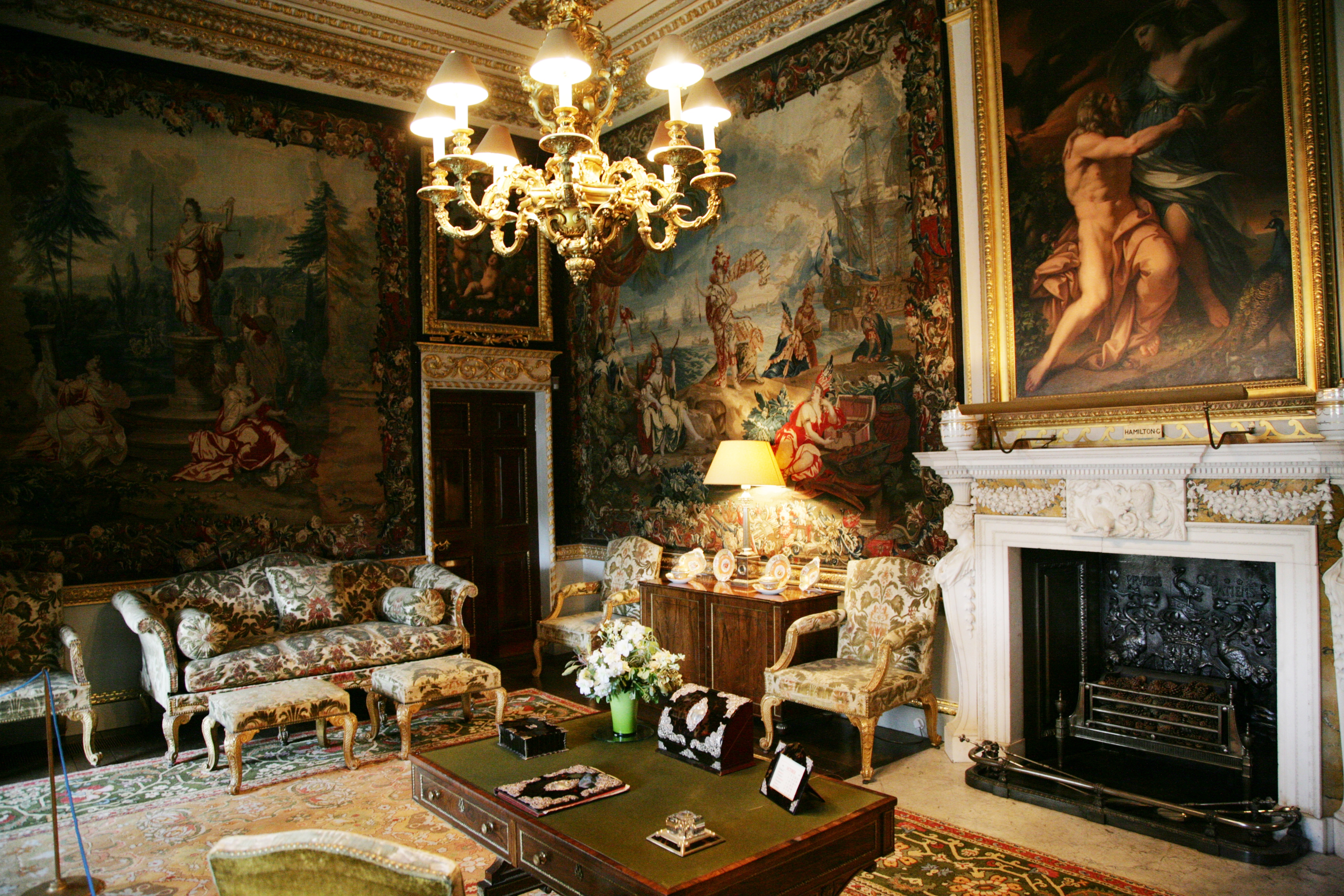
The Green State Bedroom

has shallow plasterwork beams outlining a circle in the centre with two semicircles from the side walls touching it, there are large rosettes in each corner and paired above the fireplace and opposite in front of the middle window. The four doorways on the side walls have entablatures. The dado, ceiling and door surrounds are white highlighted in gilt. The central chandelier is of gilded bronze and hangs from a plaster pendant. The walls are covered by the tapestries of the four continents, Europe, America & Africa are Brussels tapestries all signed A. Auwercx. Asia is a Mortlake tapestry in the same style, either side of the central window are two small Mortlake tapestries of Sleep & Vigilance, all woven by Paul Saunders and George Smith Bradshaw in 1757. The canopied bed, seat furniture and curtains, have retained their original multicoloured Genoa velvet upholstery and was designed by William Kent. There are two small pier-tables with marble tops between the windows.

- The Green State Dressing Room: a small fireplace of white marble with dark-veins, the frieze being of white marble inlaid with black marble of unusual geometric design, the walls are covered in patterned green velvet.
- The North State Dressing Room: fireplace of white marble with yellow and black veins, the frieze of yellow marble with a raised meander of white marble and a white marble plaque of a swag, the walls are covered in patterned green velvet.
- The North State Bedchamber: Is 20 feet (6.1 m) square. The fireplace is of white marble, the side pilasters carved with shallow reliefs of eagles, patera and other motifs, the frieze is of a darker white-veined marble with carved central plaque and meander of white marble. The ceiling has a rich entablature, the frieze decorated with palmettes, the centre of the ceiling has a circle outlined by a richly molded plaster beam. The dado, ceiling and door surrounds are white highlighted in gilt. There is a table with a top made from a mosaic bought as originating from Hadrian's Villa, now believed to be an 18th-century copy. The four-poster bed is Regency. The walls are covered in patterned red velvet.
- The State Sitting Room: Is 27 by 15 feet (4.6 m). The fireplace with shallow carvings of dark green marble with white veins, the frieze of onyx with a plain central plaque of polished red granite. The dado, ceiling and door surrounds are white highlighted in gilt. The walls are covered by 17th-century Brussel's tapestries designed by Peemans, depicting the twelve months of the year. There is a Kent sofa and arm-chairs covered in red velvet and a pair of torchieres.

The Family Wing

- The Long Library: Is 54 by 18 feet (5.5 m) and is on the west side of the wing. This was the first major interior of the House to be completed, in 1741, and has a chimneypiece carved by one Marsden, of yellow Siena marble with black veins with details in white marble. The overmantel with a pediment enclosing acanthus foliage and a shell, contains a mosaic depicting a lion fighting a leopard. Originally from the Roman theatre at Gubbio, the mosaic once adorned Palazzo Gabrielli-Mignanelli in Rome, and was acquired in that city by Coke of Norfolk, during his Grand Tour in Italy in c1772. The built-in bookcases were designed by William Kent, there are four matching large bookcases with open pediments flanking the fireplace and the central window of the west wall, plus eight smaller bookcases flanking the windows in the south and north walls, and at each end of the east and west walls. The ceiling has a deep plain cove that is half groin vaulted, three on the end walls and seven on the long walls, the flat centre of the ceiling has a meander plaster beam along the edge, centered by three octagon medallions defined by plaster beams, with two gilt brass chandeliers hanging from the two side medallions. The two doorways have entablatures with richly carved friezes. There is a third door, disguised as part of the bookcase between the south door and fireplace, this is covered in leather books spines. The walls, bookcases, ceiling, overmantel and door cases are all white with gilt highlights on the mouldings. Most of the furniture is of little historic interest, being for comfort, as this is the main room in the family wing.

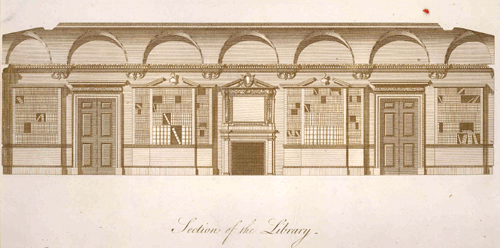
Section of the Long Library

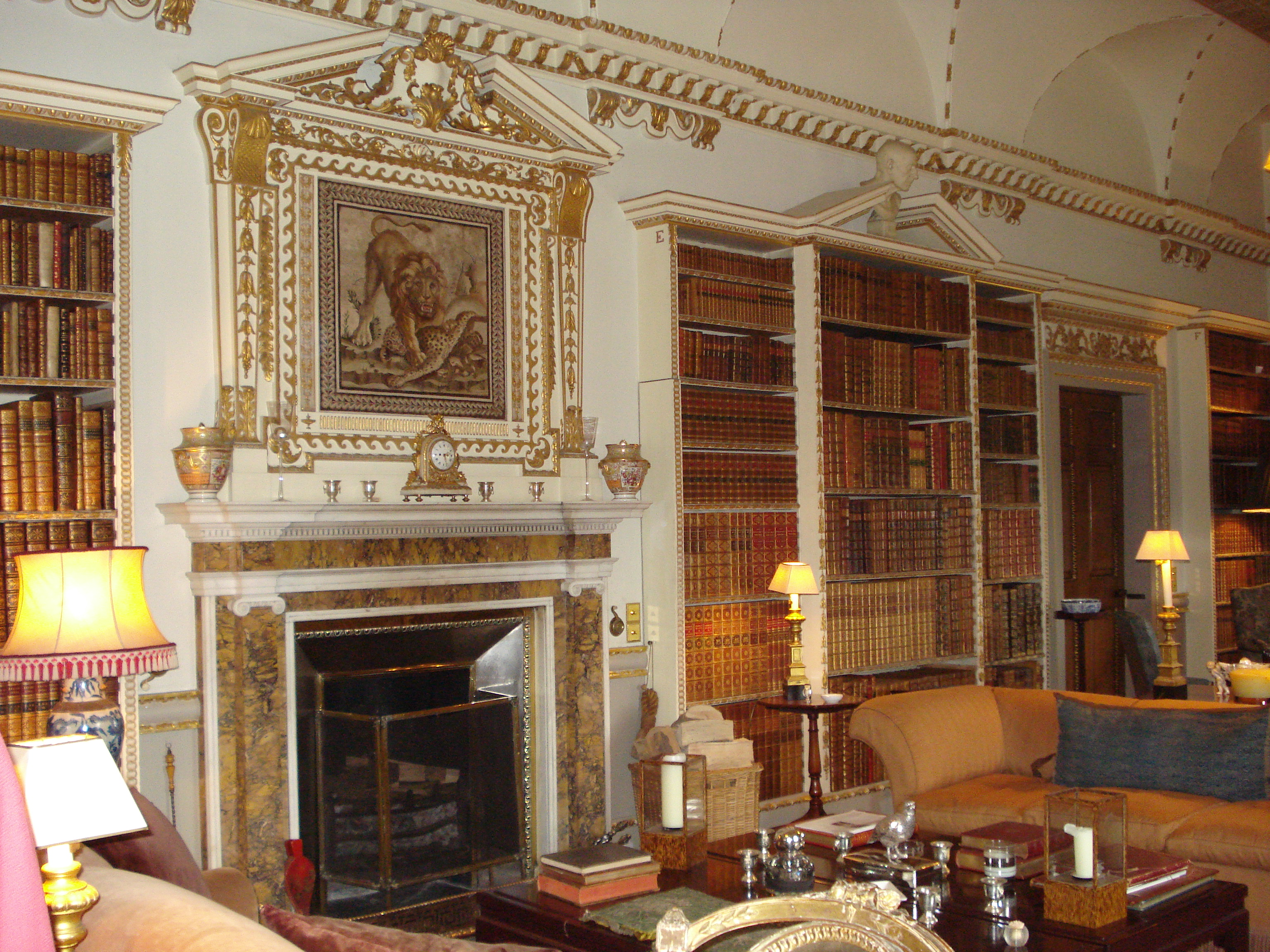
Fireplace wall of the Long Library

- The Classical Library: Is 18 by 24 feet (7.3 m), created in 1816 by 'Coke of Norfolk' from a former ante-room and is the central room on the north side of the wing. The fireplace is fairly plain of white-veined dark marble. It is flanked by two doors with entablatures with decorative friezes. The doors in the middle of the side walls are surmounted by open pediments; four built-in bookcases in the style of Kent, flank the doors (with open pediments). The ceiling is divided into nine zones by plaster beams with simple decoration. The walls, bookcases, ceiling, overmantel and door cases are all white with gilt highlights on the mouldings.
- The Manuscript Library: Created in 1816 by 'Coke of Norfolk' from the former dressing room belonging to the main family bedroom, pedimented bookcases flank each door of the side walls.
- Lady Leicester's Sitting Room: Is 18 by 24 feet (7.3 m) and is the central room on the south side of the wing. The fireplace carved by Marsden is of white marble richly carved with egg and dart around the grate, and the frieze with acanthus foliage and a central rosette. The overmantel with its Canaletto painting is richly decorated and is surmounted by a small oval portrait beneath an open pediment with two flanking urns. The four doors have entablatures with carved friezes. The ceiling has a decorated frieze, the ceiling divided by plaster beams into various geometrical shapes. The walls, ceiling, overmantel and door cases are all white with gilt highlights on the mouldings.

The Guest Wing

- The Venetian Room: Is 18 by 24 feet (7.3 m), is the main guest bedroom and is the central room on the north side of the wing. The fireplace is of black marble with white veins, the carved frieze of white marble has a plain central plaque of green marble with mottling. The plaster decorative overmantel has an open pediment and surrounds an oval portrait. Two doors flank the fireplace with two more on the side walls near the window, all have entablatures with decorative frieze and surmounted by portraits. The ceiling has a rich entablature with a rinceaux frieze, and plaster beams dividing the ceiling into various geometric shapes. The window Venetian with central Corinthian columns and matching pilasters. The walls are covered by 18th-century tapestries with a pastoral theme with playing cupids. There is a gilt wood chandelier.
- There are a total of six bedrooms in the Guest Wing, four on the first and two on the second floor. Including: The Red Parrot bedroom named after the painting by Frans Snyders, the Red Bedroom and The Yellow Tapestry room.

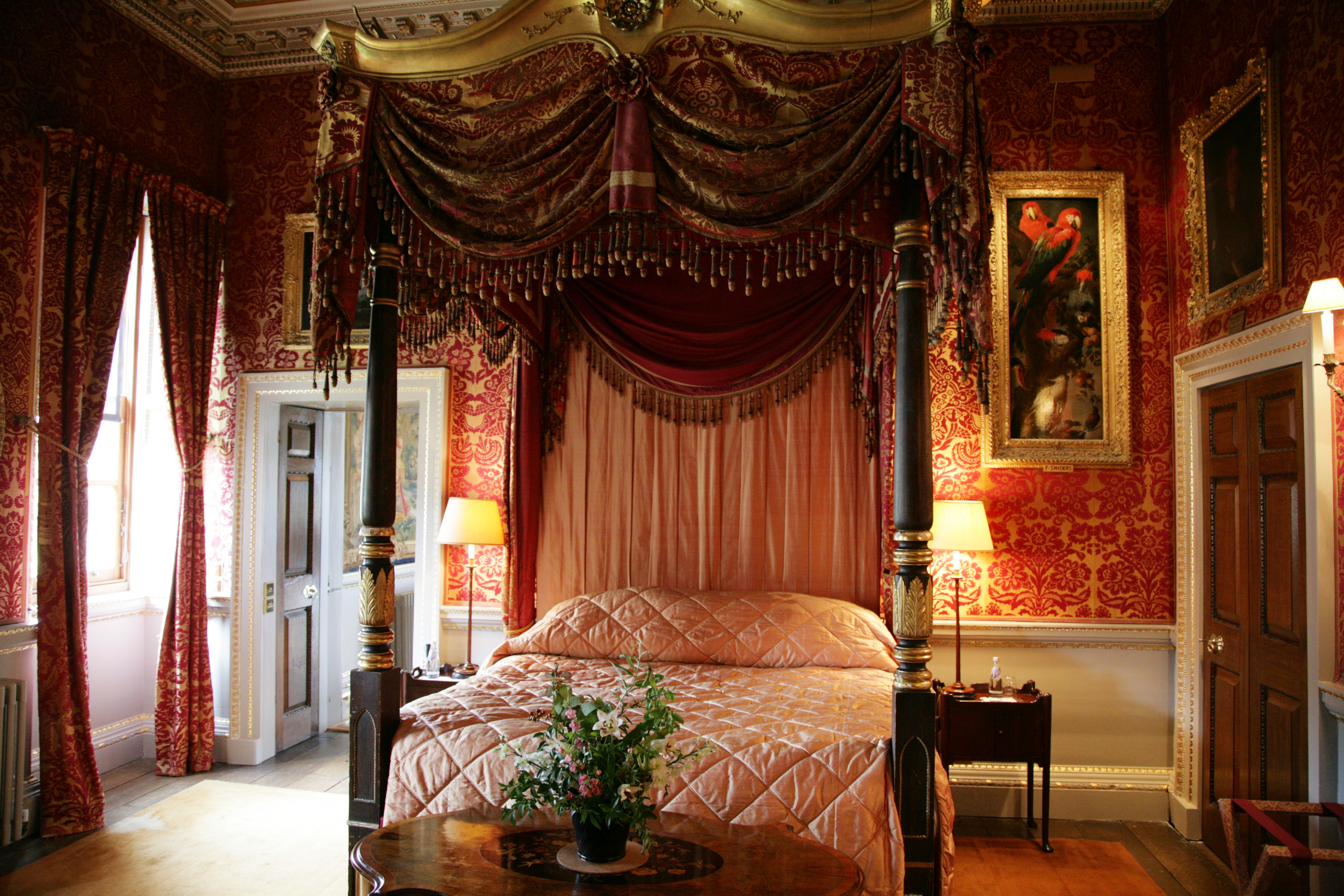
The Red Parrot Bedroom

The Chapel Wing

- The Chapel: Is 54 by 18 feet (5.5 m), rising through two floors, the ground floor and piano nobile. The cedar-wood gallery supported by two Corinthian columns, was for use by the family and is at piano nobile level. The lower walls are clad in alabaster, the upper in white plaster with the paintings inset in plaster frames and a white plaster richly coffered-ceiling surrounded by a rich plaster entablature. The paintings above the altar are enclosed in an alabaster reredos with engaged-Corinthian columns flanking the central painting and matching pilasters the side paintings, these support a segmental alabaster pediment and moulded plaster work surrounding the window above. The walls, ceiling, overmantel and door cases are all white.

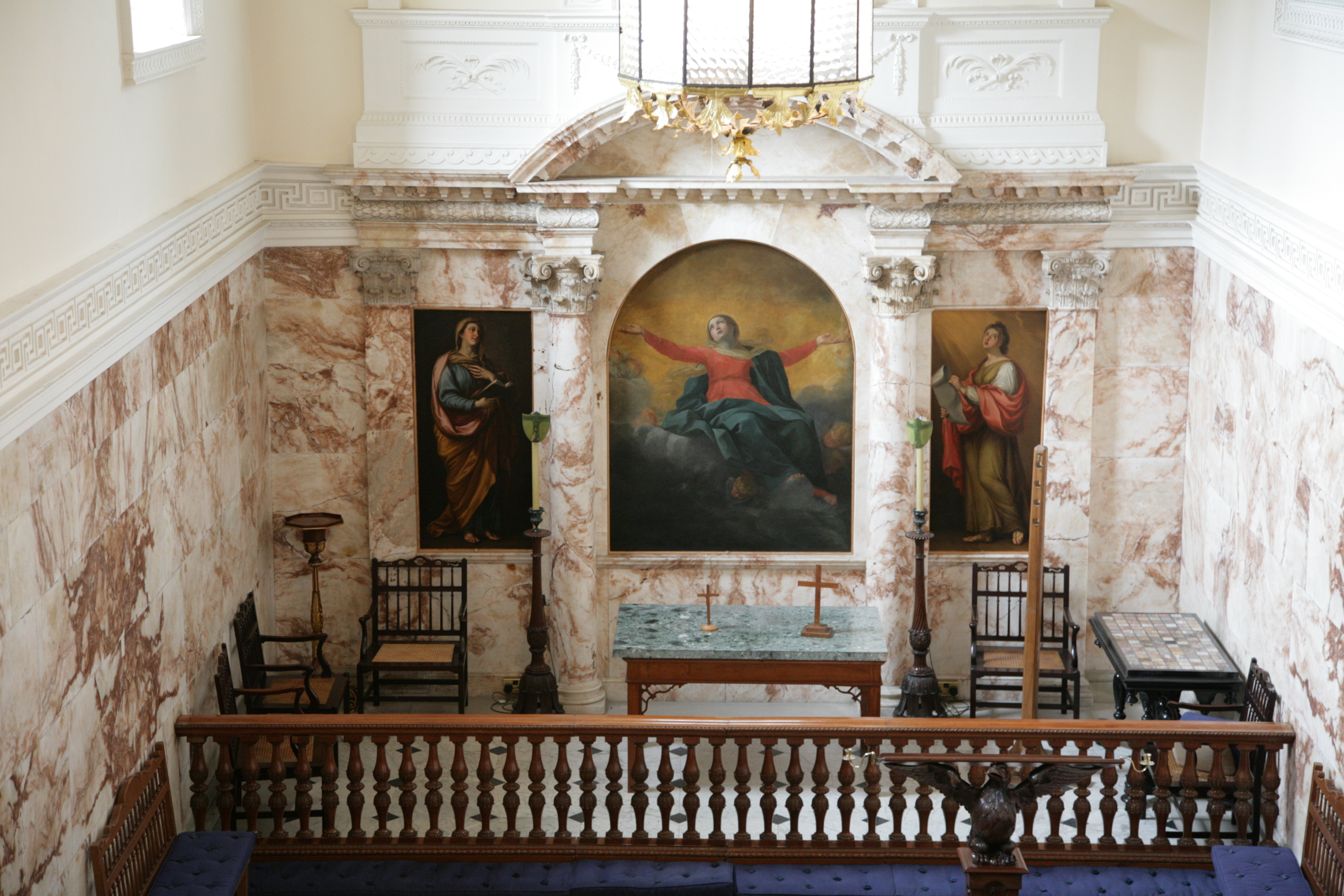
The Chapel

The Kitchen Wing

- The Kitchen: Is 24 by 54 feet (16 m). Rising through the ground and first floors running north to south across the centre of the wing, the north wall has a Venetian window at upper floor level. The east wall has a series of cast iron cooking ranges. The extensive copper Batterie de cuisine survives. This kitchen has not been used as such since 1939.

== Bibliography ==
- Schmidt, Leo and others (2005). Holkham. Munich, Berlin, London, New York: Prestel
- Angelicoussis, Elizabeth (2001). The Holkham Collection of Classical Sculptures, Verlag Philipp von Zabern
- Hussey, Christopher (1955), Pages 131–146, English Country Houses: Early Georgian 1715–1760, London, Country Life
- Pevsner, Nicholas & Wilson, Bill (1999) Pages 413–424, Buildings of England: Norfolk 2: North-West and South, London, Penguin
- Wilson, Michael I. (1984), William Kent: Architect, Designer, Painter, Gardener, 1685–1748, London, Routledge & Kegan Paul
- Hassall W.O., ed. (1970), The Holkham library: illuminations and illustrations in the manuscript library of the Earl of Leicester, Oxford, The Roxburghe Club
- Mortlock, D.P., (2006) The Holkham Library: A History and Description, Oxford, The Roxburghe Club
- Sayer, Michael (1993), Pages 144–146, The Disintegration of a Heritage: Country Houses and their Collections 1979–1992, Norwich, Michael Russell
- Brettingham, Matthew, (1761), The Plans, Elevations and Sections, Of Holkham in Norfolk, London, J. Haberkorn, the 2nd edition (1773) with additional material by Matthew Brettingham the younger
- Harris, Eileen, (1990), Pages 123–124 British Architectural Books and Writers 1556–1785, Cambridge, Cambridge University Press
- Hiskey, Christine, (1997), The Building of Holkham Hall: Newly Discovered Letters, published in Architectural History Volume 40: 1997, The Journal of the Society of Architectural Historians of Great Britain
- Scott, Jonathan, (2003), Pages 73–82 The Pleasures of Antiquity: British Collectors of Greece and Rome, New Haven & London, Yale University Press
- Beard, Geoffrey, (1981), Pages 180–184, Craftsmen and Interior Decoration in England 1660–1820, London, Bloomsbury Books
- Cornforth, John, (2004), Pages 313–324, Early Georgian Interiors, New Haven & London, Yale University Press
- Worsley, Giles, (1995), Pages 139–140, Classical Architecture in Britain: The Heroic Age, New Haven & London, Yale University Press
- Lees-Milne, James, (1962), Thomas Coke, 1st Earl of Leicester in Pages 221–263, Earls of Creation: Five Great Patrons of Eighteenth-Century Art, London, Hamish Hamilton
