= Camlet =

Woven fabric

Camlet, also commonly known as camlot, camblet, or chamlet, is a woven fabric that might have originally been made of camel or goat's hair, later chiefly of goat's hair and silk, or of wool and cotton. The original form of this cloth was very valuable; the term later came to be applied to imitations of the original eastern fabric.

In the 18th century, England, France, Holland, and Flanders were the chief places of its manufacture; Brussels exceeded them all in the beauty and quality of its camlets, followed by England.

A variety of terms have been used for camlet in different forms:

- Figured camlets are of one color, on which are stamped various figures, flowers, foliages, etc. The figures were applied with hot irons, passed together with the fabric, under a press. In the 18th century, these were chiefly brought from Amiens and Flanders. In antiquity, figured camlets were sought more than in modern times.
- Water camlets, after weaving, received a certain preparation with water; and were afterwards passed under a hot press, giving them a smoothness and lustre.
- Moreen a thick woolen stuff used in upholstery. It is a variety of watered camlet.
- Waved camlets feature impressed waves, as on tabbies.

Manufacturers of camlets had to take care not to introduce any unnecessary pleats in the fabric, as they were almost impossible to undo. This difficulty was so notorious, that a proverb existed, stating that someone "is like a camlet—he has taken his pleat."

== Etymology ==
The origin of the term is uncertain. While certain authors reference camlets as originally being made of camel hair, others believe it is from the Arabic seil el kemel, the Angora goat. According to Chambers's Encyclopaedia, it comes from Arabic chamal, meaning fine.

French scholar Gilles Ménage determined that "camlet" was derived from zambelot, a Levantine term for stuffs made with the fine hair of a Turkish goat, probably the Angora goat, from which comes the term Turkish camelot. Bochart claimed zambelot was a corruption from Arabic. Others called it capellote, from capelle, she-goat. Still others have sourced camelot from the bare Latin camelus, so that camelot should properly signify a fabric made of camel hair.

== See also ==
- Harateen
