= Tammy (cloth) =

Fine lightweight quality worsted material with a glazed surface

Tammy was a fine lightweight quality worsted material with a glazed surface. Tammy was originally a wool-made material but later also produced by using a cotton warp and worsted weft.

== Use ==
Tammy was used in embroidery work such as cross-stitch. It was used for various ladies' dresses, in petticoats, for lining men's clothing, and in sieves and strainers.

== See also ==
- Cherryderry
