= Antoine Desgodetz =

French architect

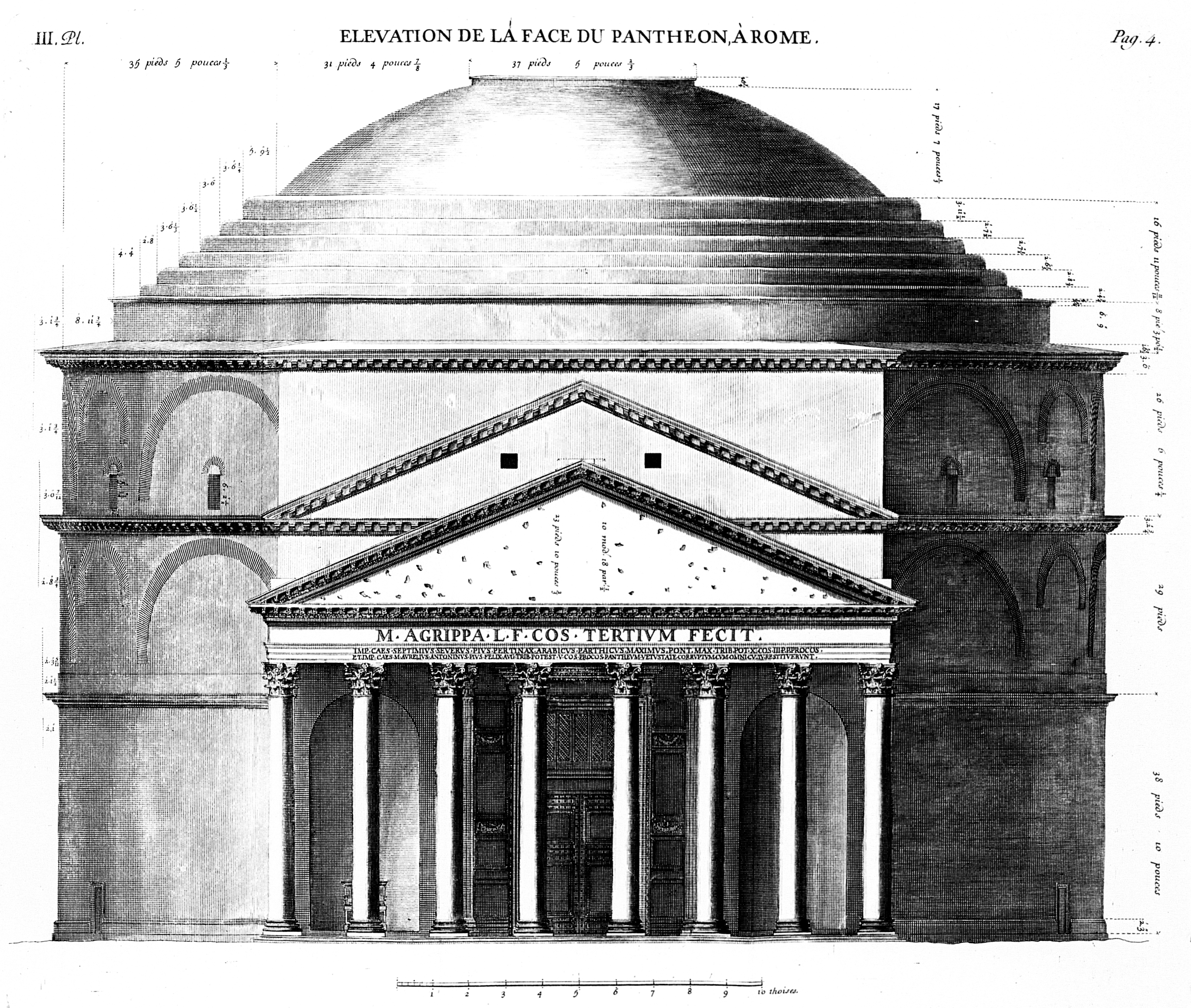
Antoine Desgodetz' elevation of the Pantheon in Les edifices antiques de Rome: engravings served designers who never travelled to Rome.

Antoine Babuty Desgodetz's (1653–1728) publication Les edifices antiques de Rome dessinés et mesurés très exactement (Paris 1682) provided detailed engravings of the monuments and antiquities of Rome to serve French artists and architects. Desgodetz had been sent to Rome in an official capacity, part of French architectural and artistic policy, and the engravings for his publication were supervised by Jean-Baptiste Colbert, according to Desgodetz' introduction. The young architect with a copy of Les edifices antiques de Rome could determine the precise proportions of many Roman structures, such as the portico of the Pantheon, or the Temple of Vesta, Tivoli, that were considered the best models, a practice that had the effect of standardizing the details of academic architecture in France. His Edifices antiques was reissued in Paris, 1729 and again in 1779, when it proved as helpful to Neoclassical architects as it had been to classicizing Late Baroque ones. The young Robert Adam toyed with the idea of producing a revised version of Desgodetz before he hit on the idea of striking into fresh territory with measured engravings of the ruins of Diocletian's palace at Spalatro (Split, Croatia).

Claude Perrault's view that the architectural norms that had formerly been presented as divinely inspired, authoritative and derived from nature, were in fact arbitrary, with a social origin under constraints of individual situations, "employed empirical observation instead of the opinion of authorities. Essential to his proof were the measurements taken by Desgodetz in Rome, clearly indicating the disparity in the proportions of the great monuments themselves."

Les edifices antiques... was reproduced in 1972 (Portland, Oregon : Collegium Graphicum).

== Bibliography ==
- Haskell, Francis, and Nicholas Penny (1981). Taste and the Antique: The Lure of Classical Sculpture 1500-1900 (Yale University Press). ISBN 9780300026412.
- Herrmann, Wolfgang (1958). "Antoine Desgodetz and the Academie Royale d'Architecture," The Art Bulletin 40 pp 23–53.
- Tzonis; Alexander; Lefaivre, Liane (1976). Review of Wolfgang Herrmann, The Theory of Claude Perrault (Studies in Architecture, Vol. XII), London: A. Zwemmer Ltd, 1973, in Journal of the Society of Architectural Historians 3 October 1976."On-line text". Archived from the original on 2009-06-27. .
