= Bastiano da Sangallo =

Italian sculptor and painter

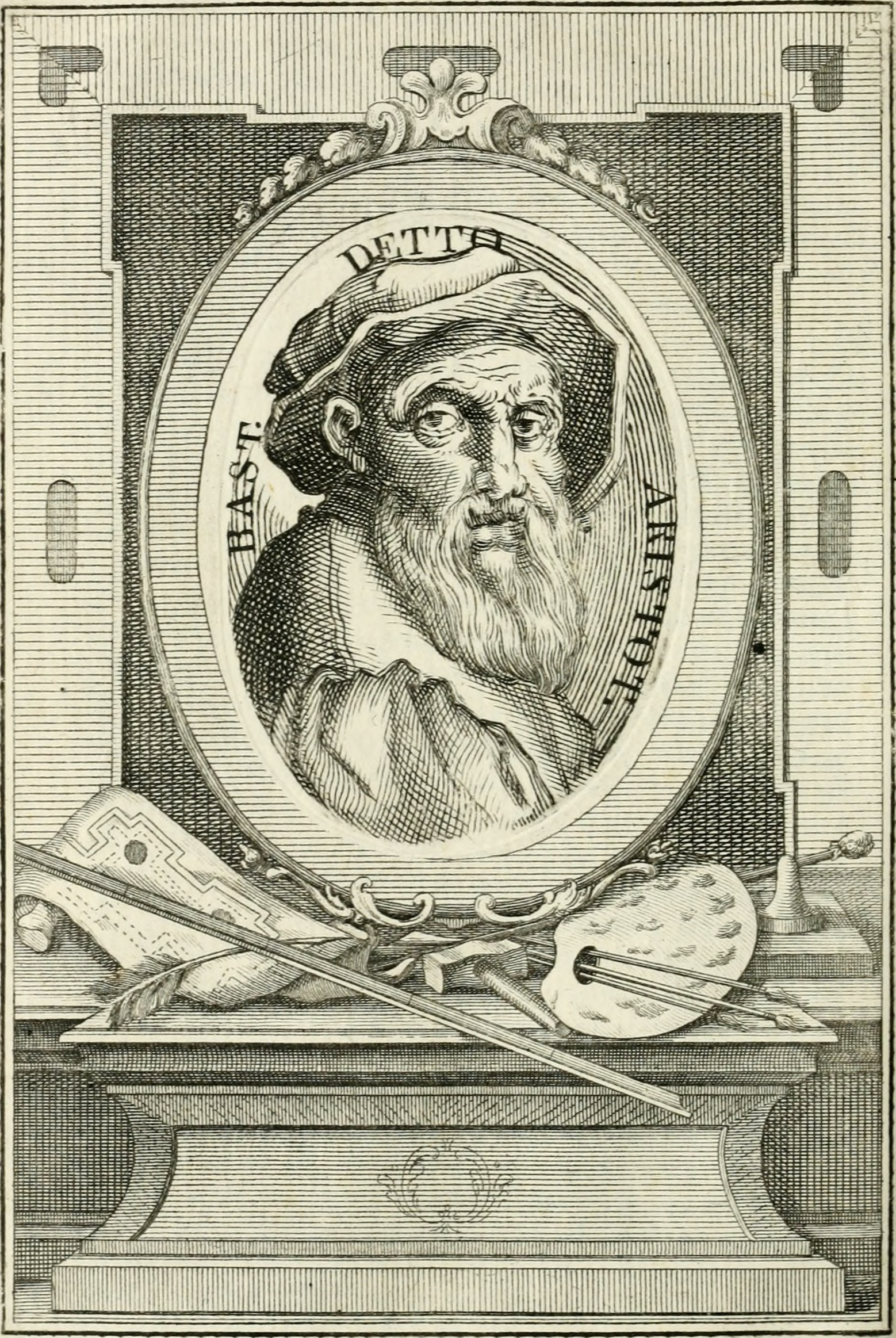
Bastiano da Sangallo

Bastiano da Sangallo (1481 – May 31, 1551) was an Italian sculptor, painter and architect of the Renaissance period, active mainly in Tuscany. He was a nephew of Giuliano da Sangallo and Antonio da Sangallo the Elder. He is usually known as Aristotile, a nickname he received from his air of sententious gravity. He was at first a pupil of Perugino, but afterwards became a follower of Michelangelo. Sangallo was mentioned by Vasari as one who made a small copy of the Cartoon of Michelangelo's Battle of Cascina (1506).
