= Cherryderry =

Striped or checked woven cloth of mixed silk and cotton

Cherryderry (also spelled Charadary or Carridary) was a blended fabric composed of a silk warp and a cotton weft, commonly woven with striped or checked pattern.

== History ==
Cherryderry dates to the 17th century fabric and was among the textile varieties known in Colonial America. The fabric was produced using raw materials imported from India.

== Use ==
Cherryderry was used for Ladies' dresses and handkerchiefs.
