= Harateen =

Woolen cloth of 18th and early 19th centuries

Harateen or harrateen was a woolen material of the 18th and early 19th-century produced in England. It was a furnishing material with a pattern used in upholstery.

== Fabrication ==
Harateen was a plain weave fabric manufactured with coarser weft than the warp yarns. Then undergoes a procedure of watering and stamping. The two layers of cloth were pressed together with a hot press. Imprinted, thicker horizontal strands produce a distinct wavy pattern.

== Use ==
This fabric was used for curtains and bed hangings.
