= Nevers faience =

Pottery made in Nevers, France, since 1580

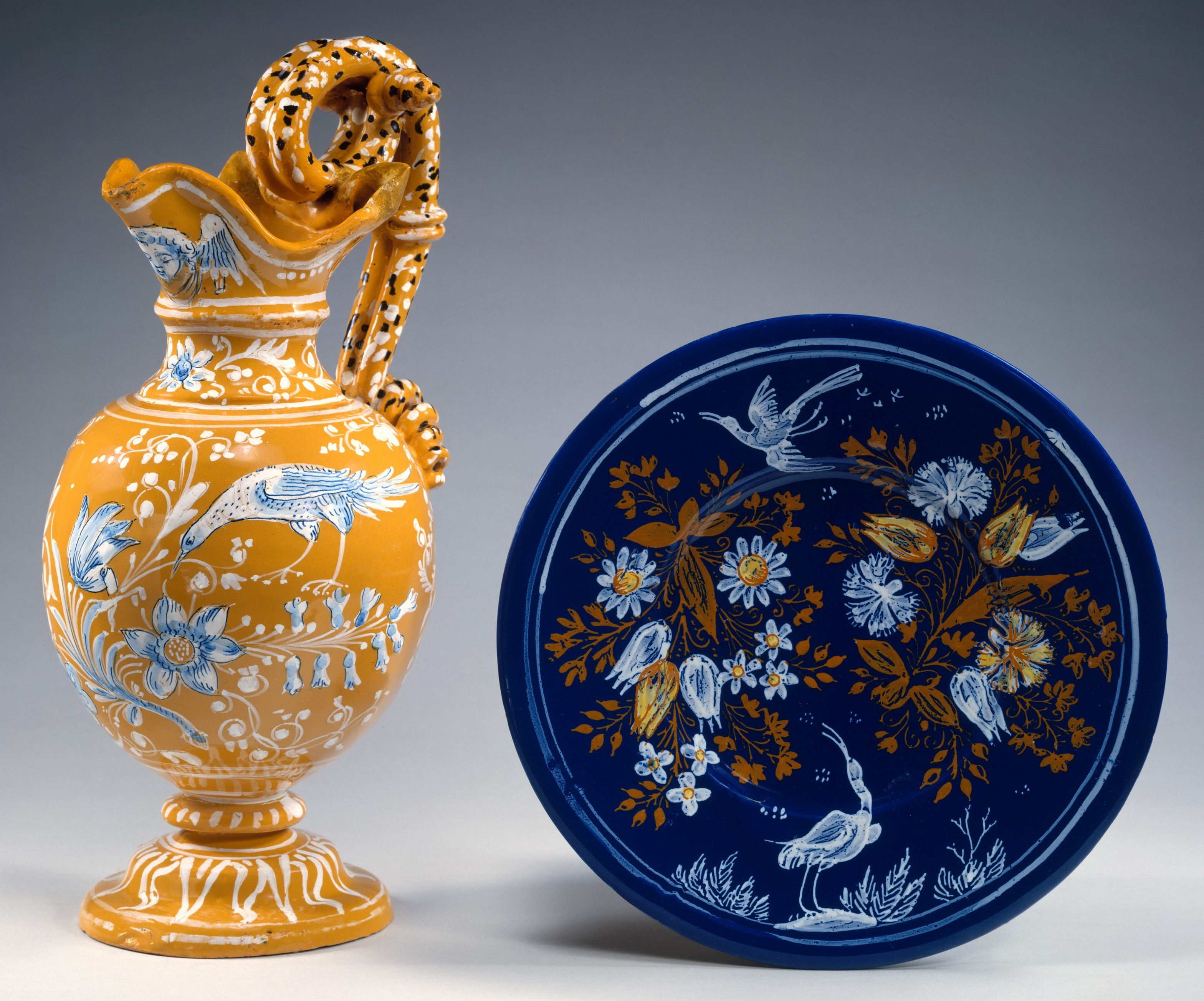
Mustard and blue solid-body wares, 1650–80, with Turkish-inspired birds and flowers.

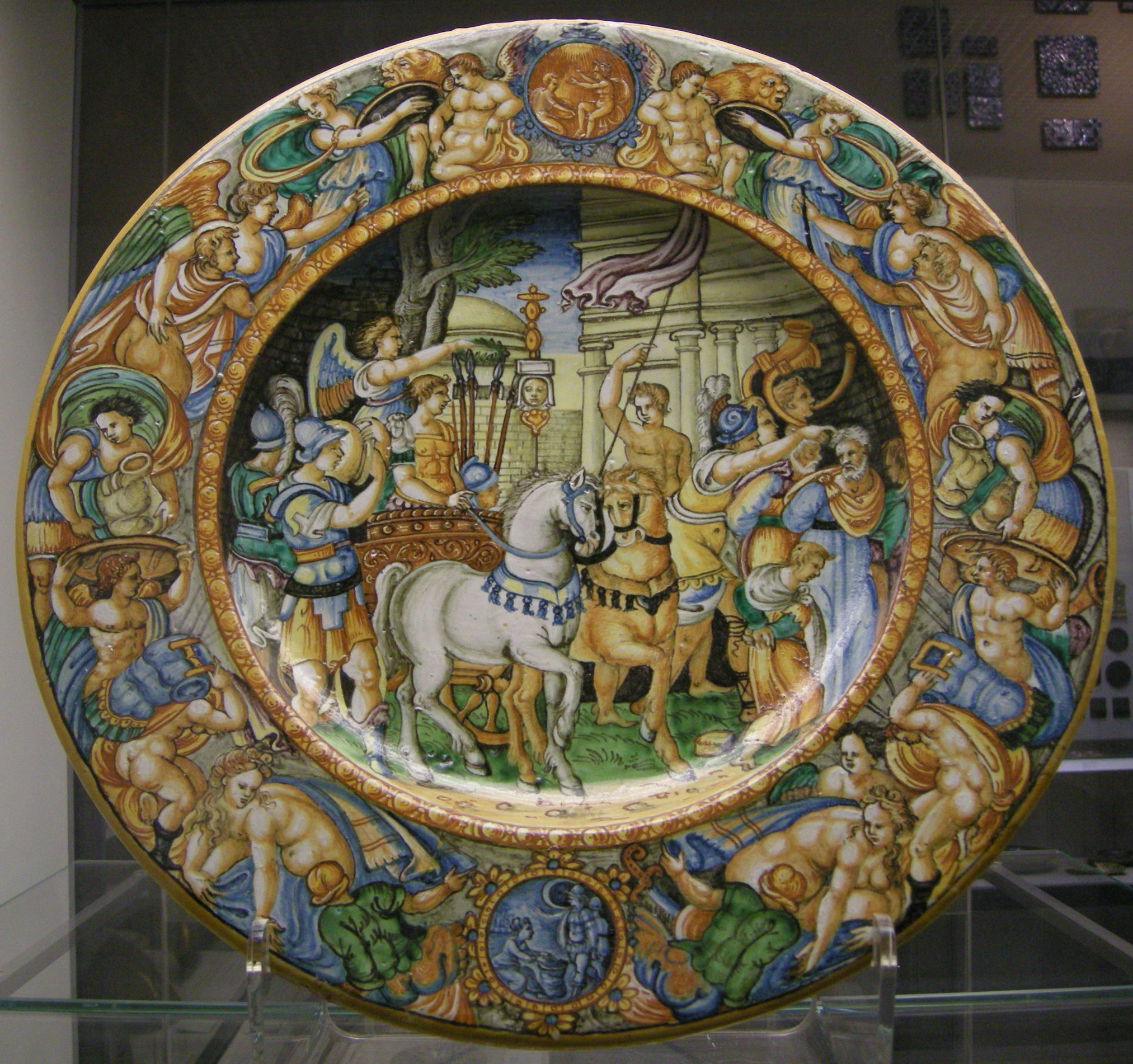
Nevers dish in the istoriato style, with the Triumph of Julius Caesar, very loosely after Mantegna, 1600–1630

The city of Nevers, Nièvre, now in the Bourgogne-Franche-Comté region in central France, was a centre for manufacturing faience, or tin-glazed earthenware pottery, between around 1580 and the early 19th century. Production of Nevers faience then gradually died down to a single factory, before a revival in the 1880s. In 2017, there were still two potteries making it in the city, after a third had closed. However the quality and prestige of the wares has gradually declined, from a fashionable luxury product for the court, to a traditional regional speciality using styles derived from the past.

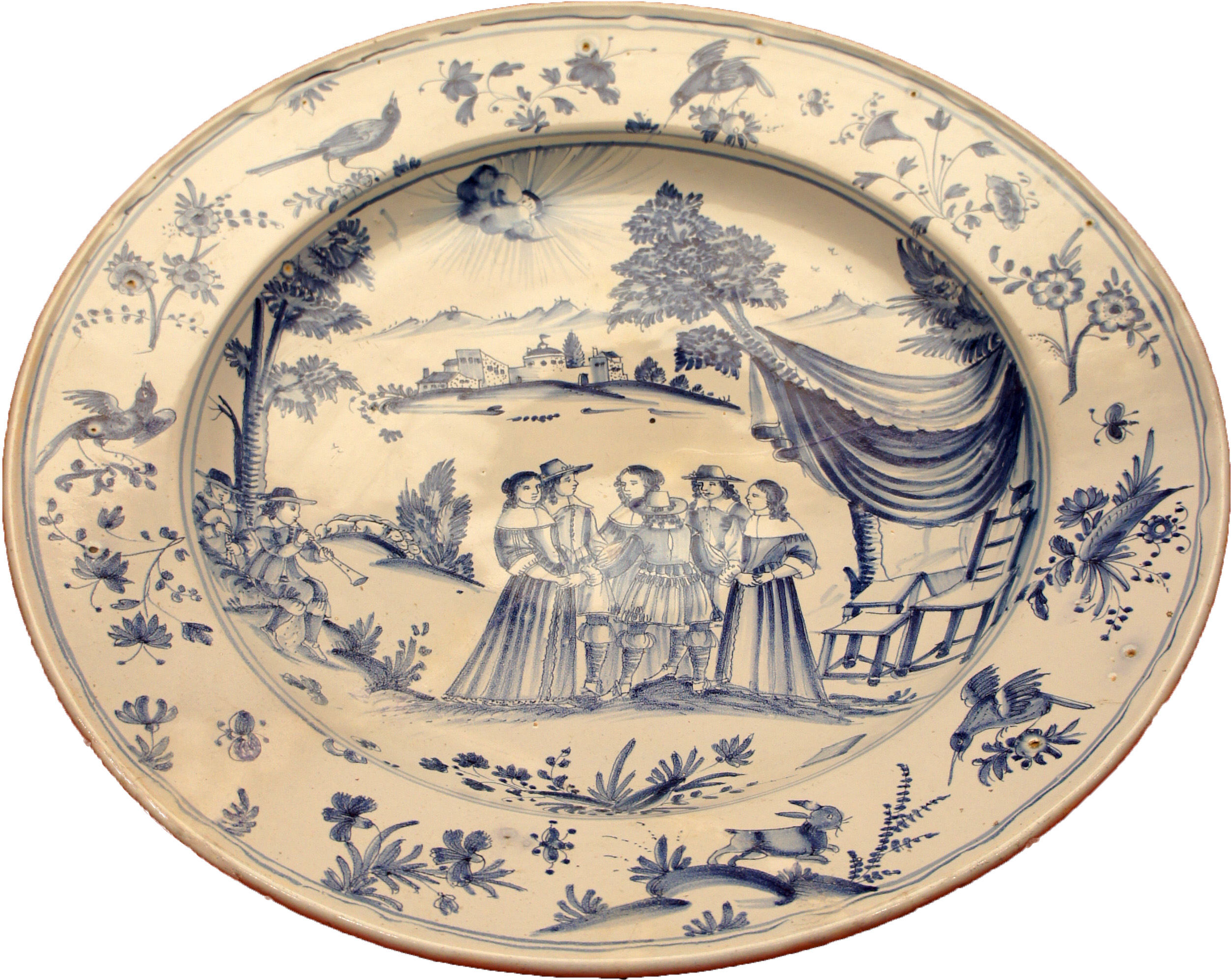
17th-century plate with genteel party in a European-style landscape. The border has birds, flowers and a rabbit, all at the same size.

Nevers was one of the centres where the istoriato style of Italian maiolica was transplanted in the 16th century, and flourished for rather longer than in Italy itself. In the 17th century, Nevers became a pioneer in imitating Asian ceramic styles in Europe, within some decades, followed by all producers of fine wares. The second half of the 17th century was Nevers' finest period, with several styles being made at the same time, including a grandiose Italianate Court style.

By the time of the French Revolution, Nevers wares had ceased to be fashionable and expensive, but the relatively crudely painted faiences patriotiques wares commenting on political events have great interest and charm. A late 19th-century revival concentrated on high-quality revivalist wares recreating past glories.

== History ==
The tradition owes its origin to Louis Gonzaga, Duke of Nevers (1539–1595), a half-French and half Italian politician and courtier who married the heiress of the Duchy of Nevers, which then still gave him great powers in the County and Duchy of Nevers. He had been born in Mantua, near several centres for Italian maiolica, which had already spread to Rouen and Lyon, and encouraged some Italian potters to move to the city. Giulio Gambin was already in Lyon and the Conrade brothers (Corrado in Italy) came from Albisola, who would found the dynasty that dominated Nevers production for a century.

Nevers already had a local unglazed pottery industry, and was a very suitable location for making faience. The city was near deposits of excellent pottery clay, an exceptionally good type of sand for making ceramic glaze, forests for wood for the kilns, and was on the major Loire river. The earliest dated piece by the Italians is from 1587.

In 1603, the brothers received a monopoly from Henri IV for the making of wares in the style of Faenza, whether painted polychrome or with white grounds, and a generation later Antoine Conrade, son of Dominique, was made faiencier ordinaire to the young Louis XIV in 1644. This was repeated in the next generation for another Dominique Conrade, given his brevet in 1672.

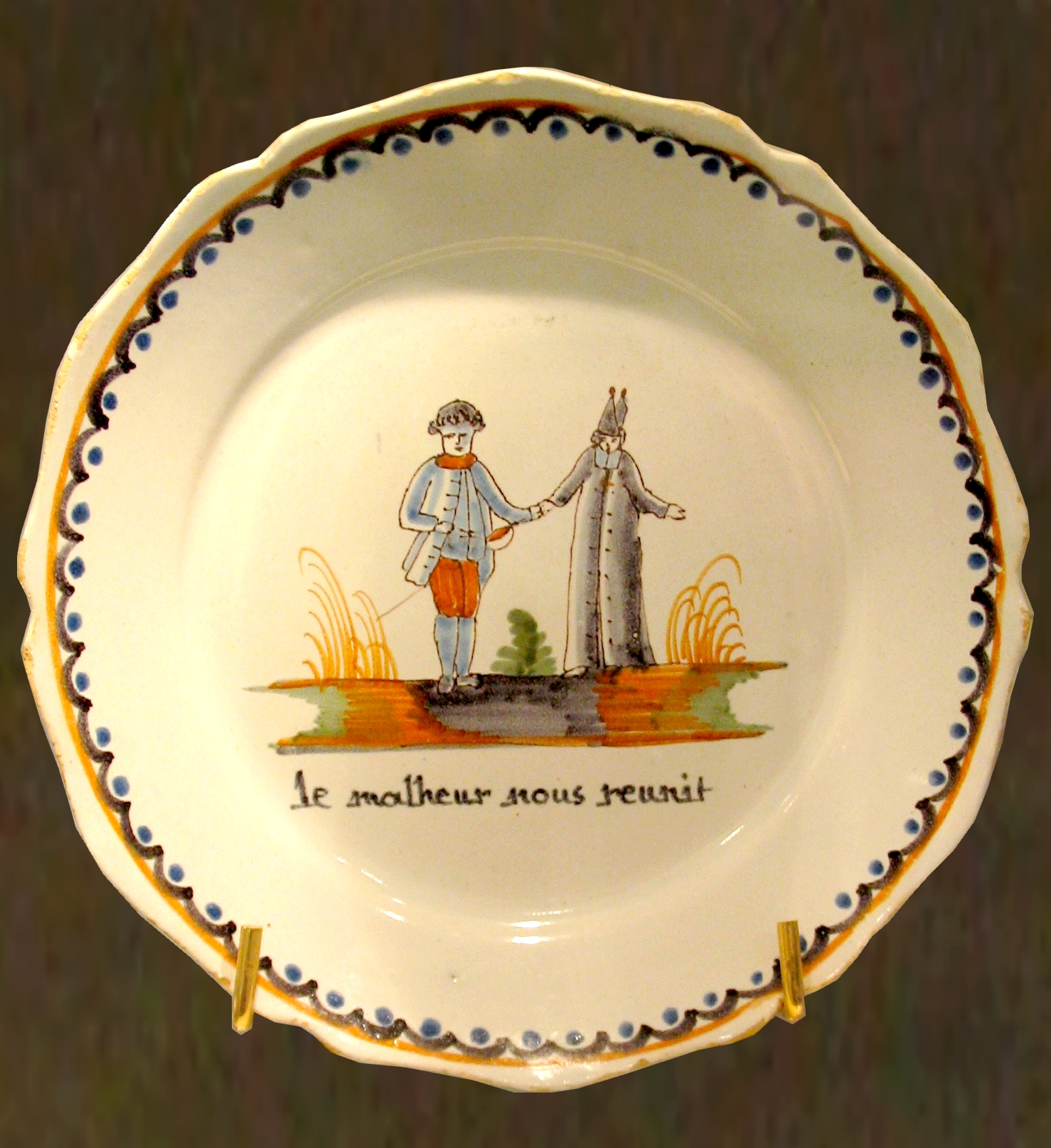
faience patriotique of the French Revolution. An aristocrat and bishop: "Unhappiness re-unites us", 1791.

The Conrade monopoly was not effective for long, with a second factory starting in 1632, and by 1652 there were four different potteries in Nevers, including one founded by Pierre Custode, whose family became the other main Nevers dynasty of potters.

The French faience industry received a huge boost when, late in his reign in 1709, Louis XIV pressured the wealthy to donate their silver plate, previously what they normally used to dine, to his treasury to help pay for his wars. There was an "overnight frenzy" as the elite rushed to get faience replacements of the best quality. Nevers garden vases in blue and white were prominently used in the gardens of the Chateau de Versailles.

The success of the wares led to several other factories opening in the early 18th century and in 1743, the government limited the number to eleven to prevent flooding the market. In 1760, a twelfth was permitted. By this period Nevers wares had been largely replaced at the top end of the market by other makers, but were producing large quantities of less expensive wares for a broader market. They did not attempt to compete with the elegant Rococo style of the French porcelain factories, which was attempted rather successfully by some makers of faience, for example the Veuve Perrin factory in Marseille. All twelve Nevers factories (still including the Conrade and Custode ateliers) were still in operation in 1790, but a commercial treaty with Great Britain in 1786 led to the French market being flooded by cheaper and better English creamwares, leading to crisis for all French manufacturers of faience, and by 1797 six had ceased operations, with the other six having reduced their workforce by half.

By this time, European porcelain was becoming cheaper and more reliable, and making life difficult for producers of high-quality earthenware across Europe. The Nevers response was to produce topical faiences patriotiques with which the English were unlikely to compete (although they had done excellent business supplying the new American republic with patriotic wares).

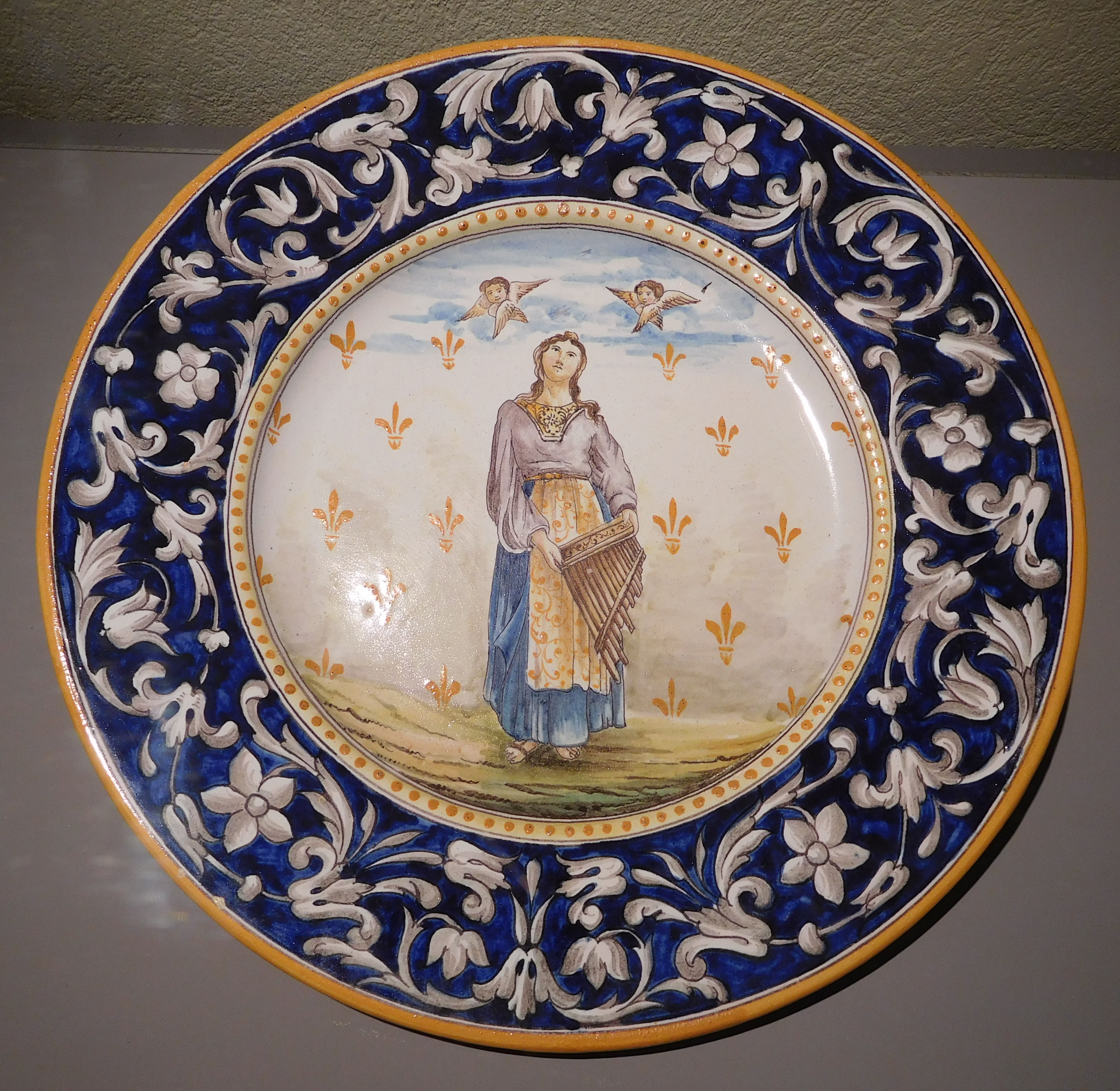
Montagon plate with Saint Cecilia, 1888

In 1838, 700 workers were reported to be employed, but by 1846, only six factories remained, and by 1850, only five factories remained. A porcelain manufactury in Nevers was also mentioned in 1844 by Alexandre Brongniart, but little is known about it.

The manufacture du Bout du monde ("End of the World" factory) was founded in 1648, and followed the general pattern of the Nevers factories. By 1875, its fortunes had reached a low ebb and it was bought by Antoine Montagnon who had ambitious plans to relaunch it to supply the market for revivalist wares imitating 17th-century pieces, often large and complex pieces. By 1881, it was the only factory left in Nevers. The Montagnon factory (faïencerie) was successful for over a century, with 50 employees around 1900, and its wares exhibited at international exhibitions, but the factory, by then the oldest in France, finally closed in 2015. In 2020, two factories remained in production, both mainly making traditional styles.

== Styles ==
The list of stylistic periods devised by the French authority du Broc de Segange in his 1863 book on Nevers faience is still often repeated, though perhaps needing some adjustment. It shows several styles in use at particular dates, which is certainly the case:

- 1600–1660: Italian style
- 1650–1750: Chinese and Japanese style
- 1630–1700: Persian style
- 1640–1789: Franco-Nivernais style
- 1700–1789: Rouen manufactory style
- 1730–1789: Tradition de Moustiers, imitating the faience of Moustiers-Sainte-Marie in the Alpes-de-Haute-Provence
- 1770–1789: Gout de Saxe (i.e., Meissen style)
- 1789 on : Decadence.

Françoise Estienne, in the 1980s, divided Nevers production in the 17th century (extended slightly at both ends) into eleven "families" based on the decoration of a study group of 1874 pieces, mainly in French museums, looking at both subjects and styles.

=== Italian style ===
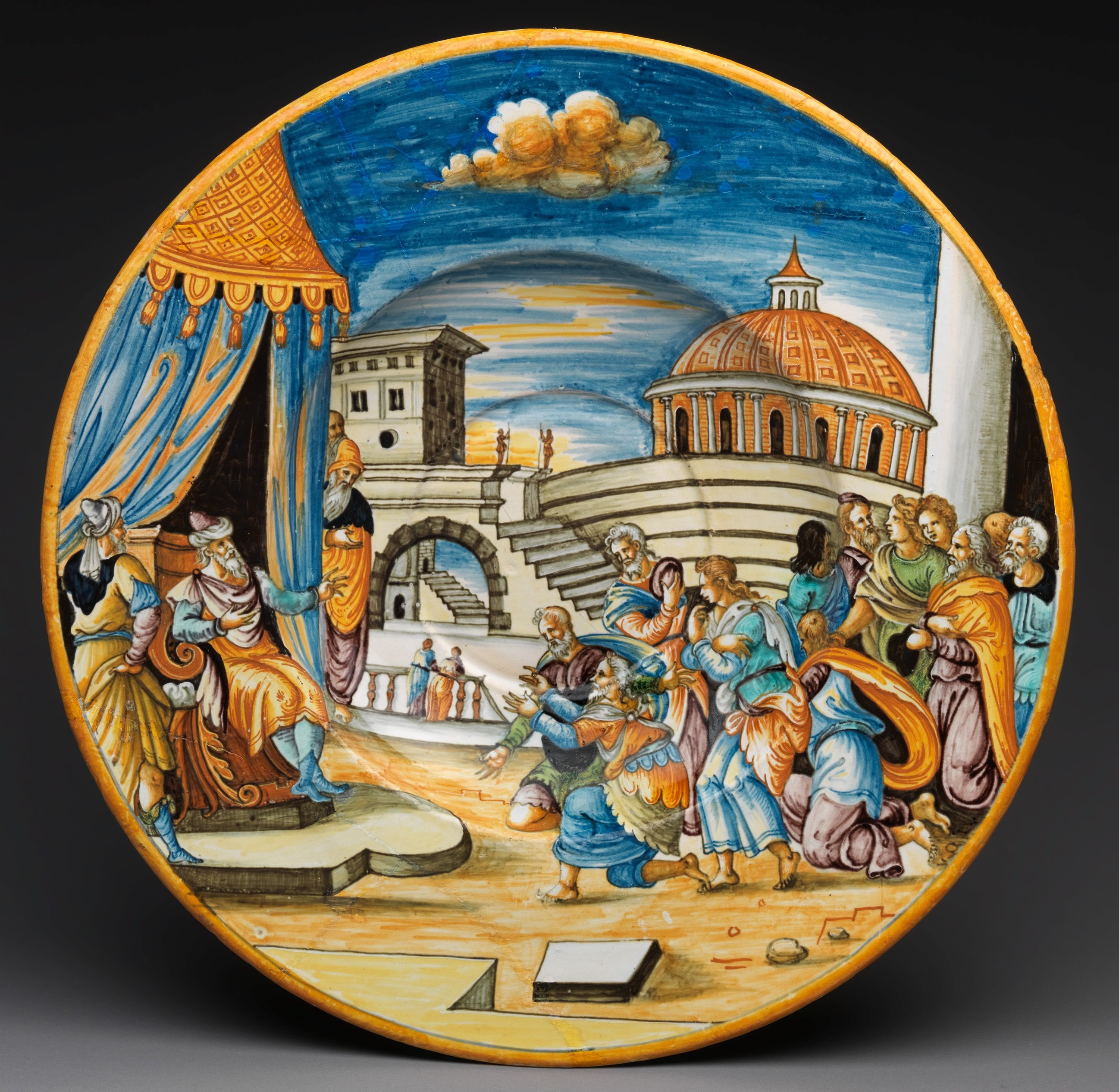
Dish with Joseph and His Brothers, 1630–45, after print by Bernard Salomon; Conrade workshop? "Inscribed on back in blue: LES FRERE' DE JIOSEPH / VENUS A LUY EN EGIPTE / AU GENESE XLII (trans.: The brothers of Joseph came to him in Egypt in Genesis 42)".

The Italian immigrants continued at Nevers the istoriato (narrative) style that was already in decline in Italy, until at least 1660. This used as many colours as were available using the grand feu technique of a single firing for the clay, glaze and painting, which required a firing temperature that only a few pigments could tolerate. As was usual in Italy by 1580, designs were mostly adapted from prints, and the outline set out on the pot by a ponci or stencil, pushing charcoal dust through pin-pricks in a paper drawing or tracing from a print.

The early pieces did not generally use distinctive marks or inscriptions, though sometimes painting "Nevers" on the base of important pieces, perhaps with a date – the earliest of these is 1589, on a dish in the Louvre. As with painted Limoges enamel of the previous century, with which Nevers decoration has some similarities, a high proportion of religious subjects illustrate Old Testament subjects. As with Italian pieces, the subjects, especially those from the Old Testament or classical mythology, tended to be named on the base, sometimes even with the bible chapter noted.

There is a good deal of uncertainty in the attribution of pieces between the Nevers workshops, and between Nevers pieces and those of other centres. The large dish with The Gathering of Manna illustrated below, a well-known piece, had been assumed to be Italian, and 16th century, until recently. Though there are still uncertainties, it is now thought to be moulded from an Italian dish (now in the Victoria and Albert Museum in London), then painted as a matching pair of that. A curious aspect of Nevers faience is that it never succeeded in producing a good red colour, unlike Rouen and other centres, the absence of which often enables Nevers pieces to be distinguished.

As well as the scenes covering a whole surface, many Nevers pieces use grotesque motifs, usually on the raised border of plates or dishes, but also sometimes in the central space. These were used in Urbino maiolica in the 1580s, and also in painted Limoges enamel. In Nevers, they might surround central decoration in all styles except the Chinese, and gradually acquire their own local character.

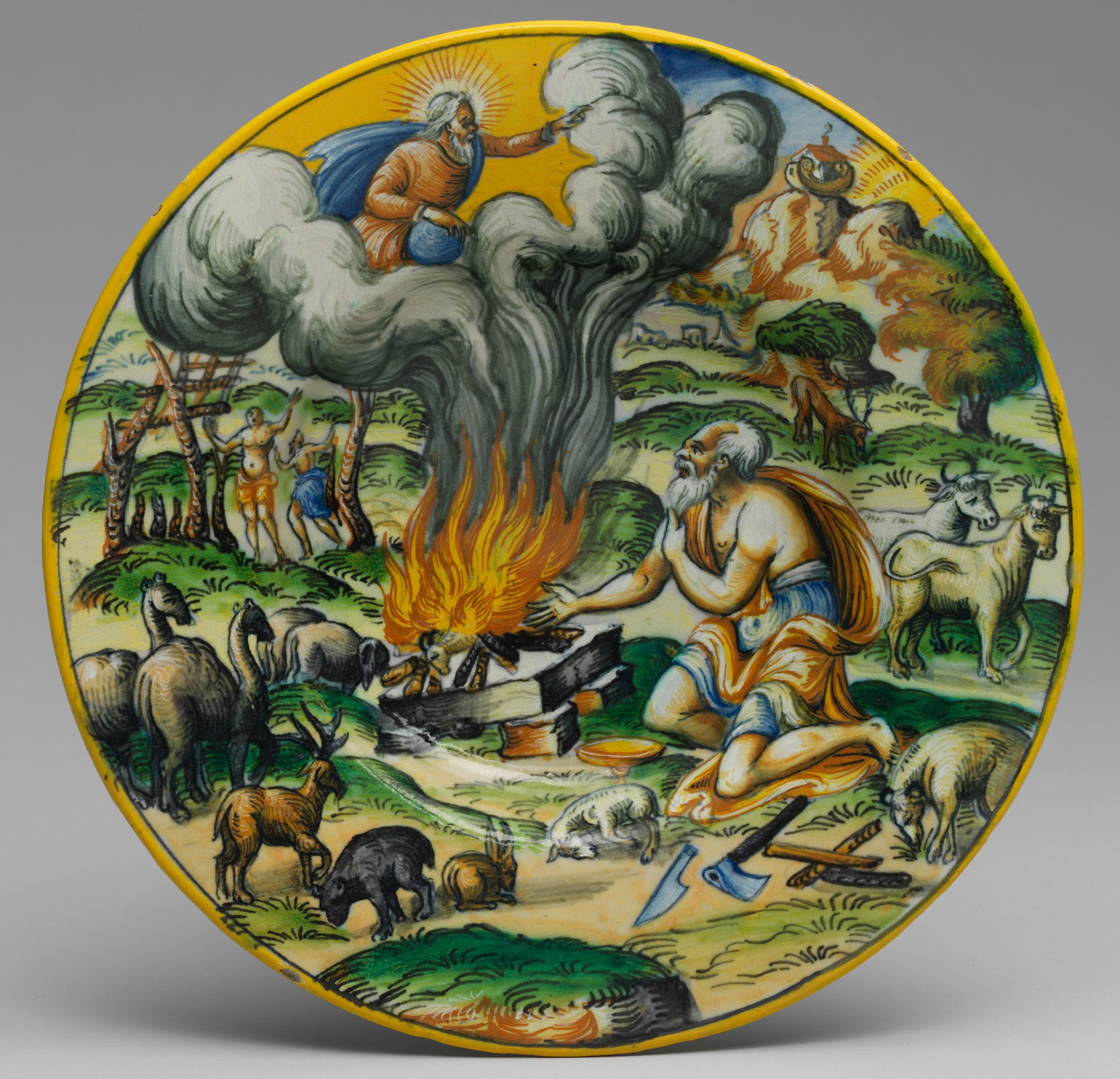
Sacrifice of Noah, 1580–1610, Nevers or Lyon

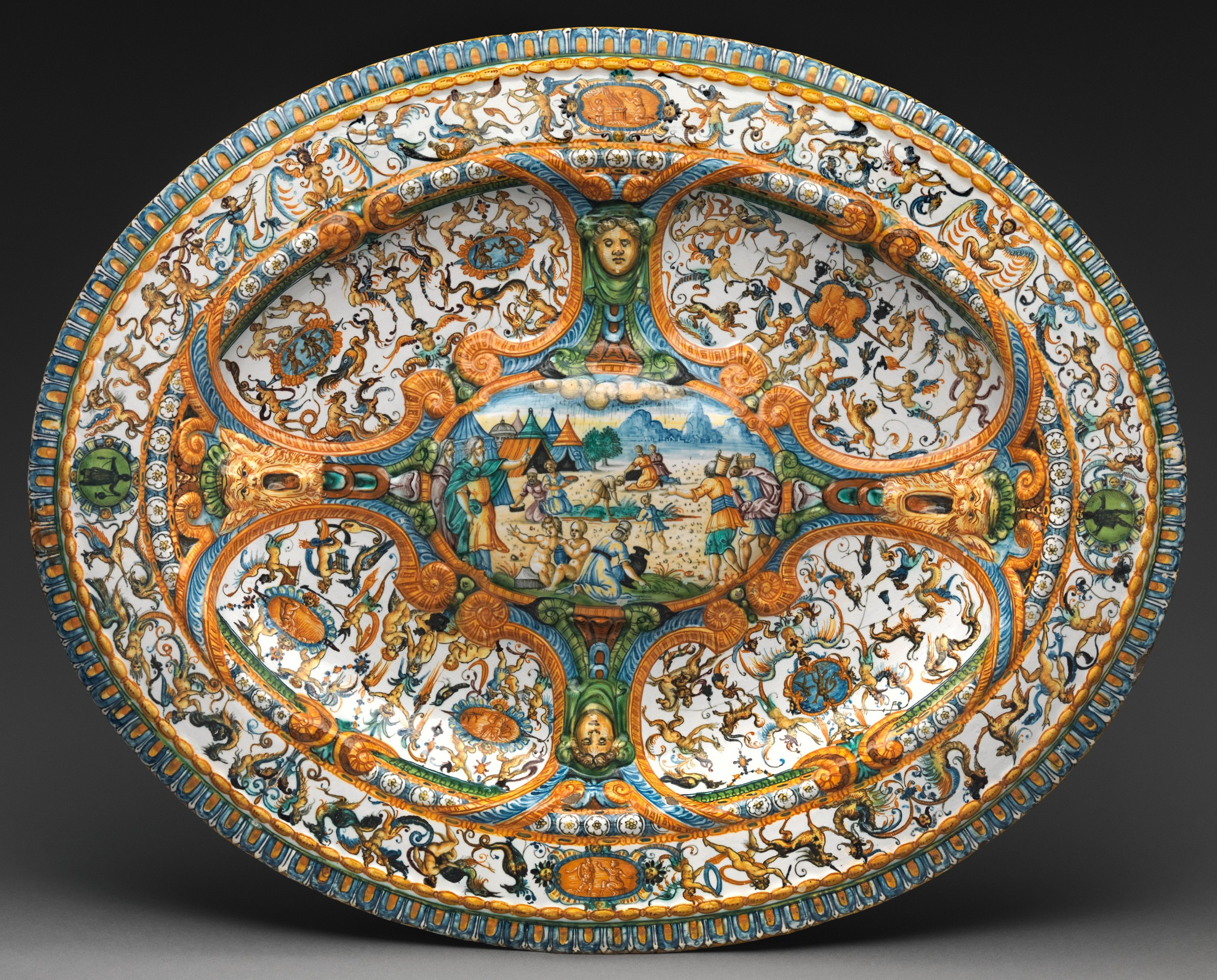
Basin or dish with The Gathering of Manna and extensive grotesques, 1620–45, probably made as a pair to an Italian dish of the 1560s.

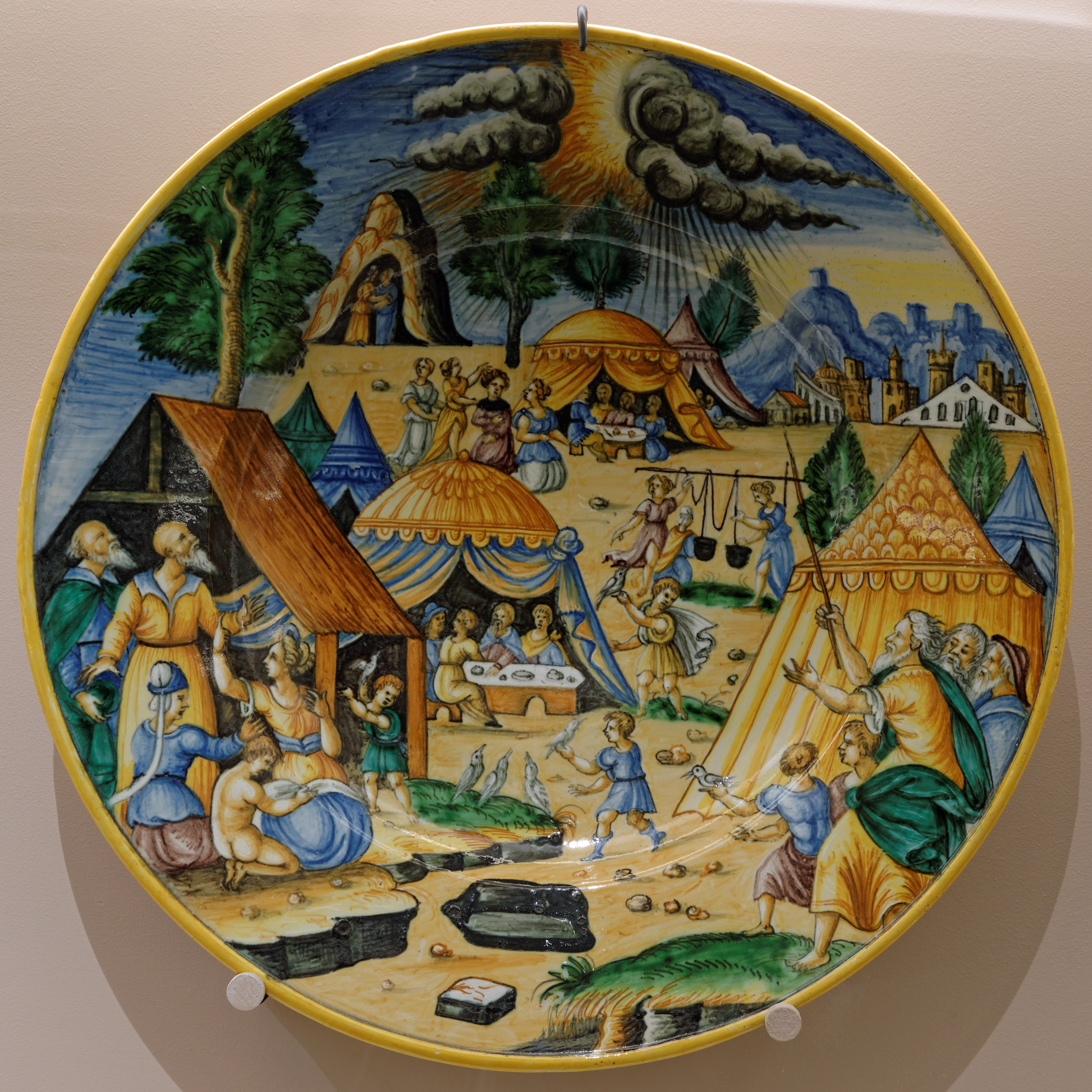
The manna in the desert, attributed to Antoine Conrade or Nicolas Estienne

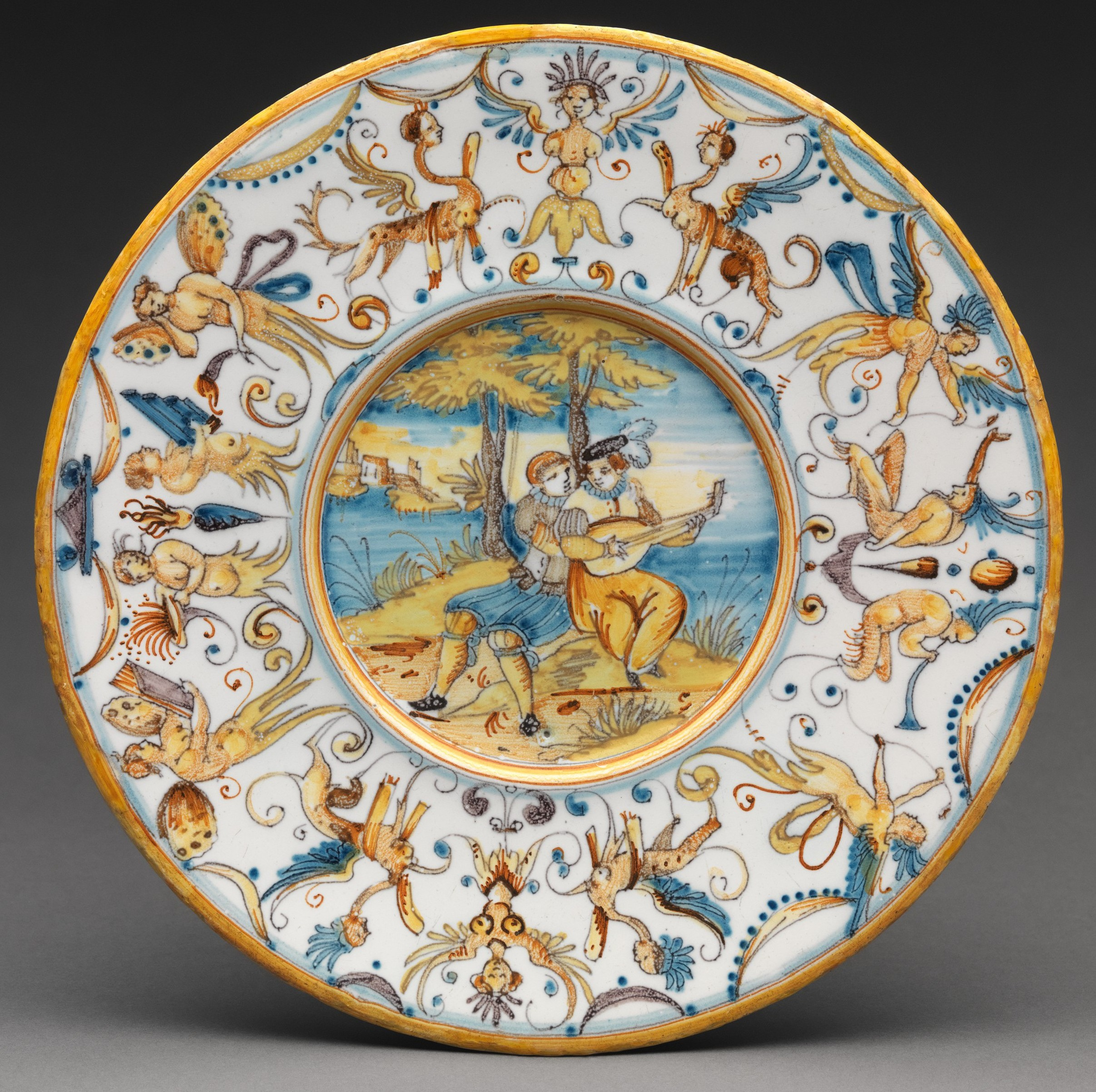
Plate with two lovers and grotesque border, dated 1644, "perhaps" Antoine Conrade.

=== Asian styles ===
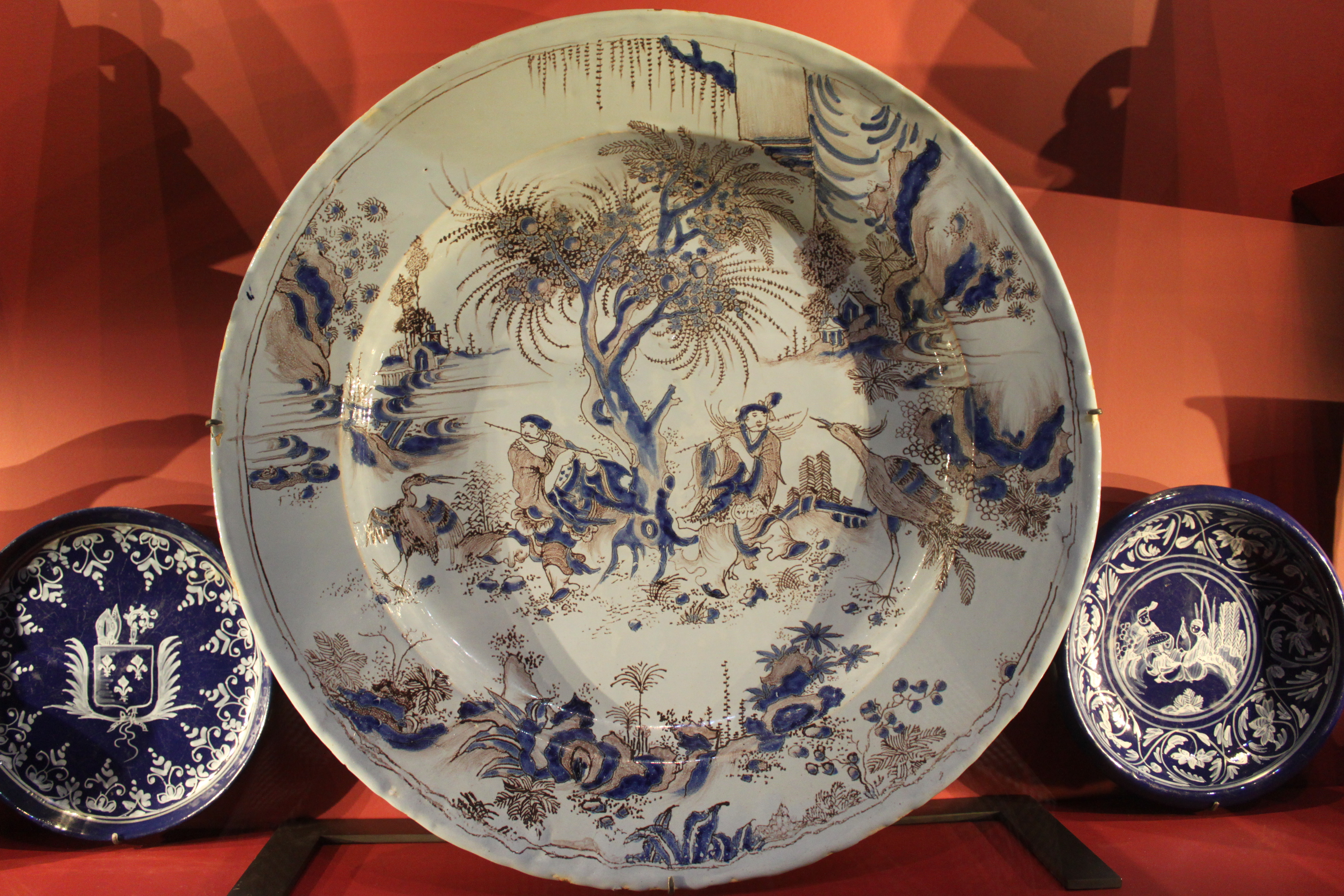
Large dish (1660–80, 49.5 cm) with Chinese-style musicians in a landscape, unusually using two colours, flanked by two "Persian style" bowls with European-style painting

A technique unique to Nevers in French faience, used on some pieces from about 1650 for a few decades, was to stain all the clay from which the body was made either in bleu de Nevers or (much more rarely) a mustard yellow (Wedgwood did the same for their jasperware a century later). This was then painted in white or other colours, using various styles, but rarely with more than two colours. This style is traditionally known as "Persian" or bleu persan, as decoration in white on a rich blue ground is often seen in Persian pottery of the period. However, the bird and flower painted decoration seen in most examples of the "Persian" style in fact derives more from Turkish Iznik pottery, which was reaching Europe through Italy. The white-on-blue Persian style was copied elsewhere, sometimes even in English delftware.

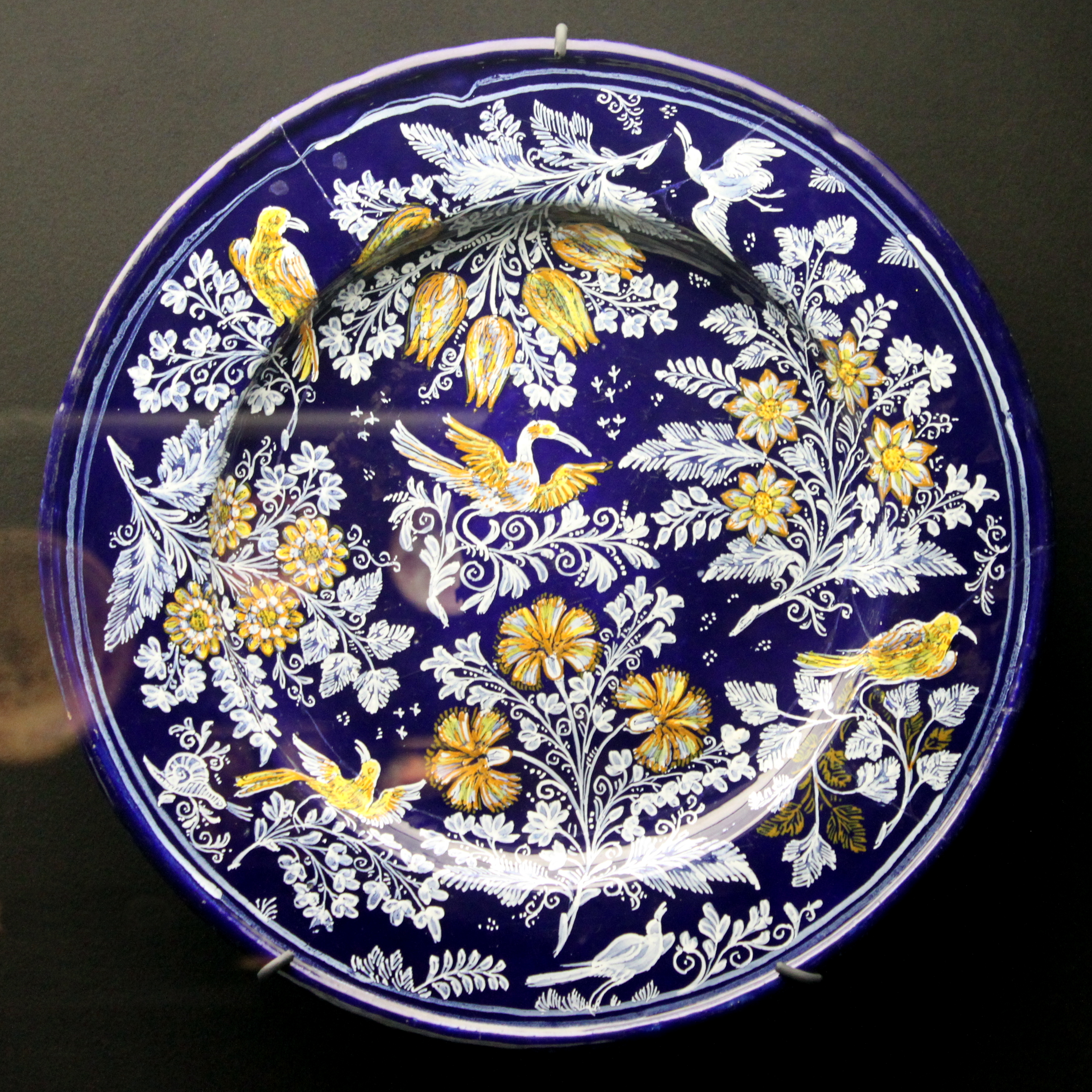
"Persian"-style with bleu de Nevers ground, 1670s

Nevers adopted Chinese vase shapes early in the 17th century, earlier than Dutch Delftware. Some Nevers pieces clearly copy Chinese export porcelain in terms of their painted decoration, both the cheaper Kraak ware and better quality blue and white wares, whereas others have decoration based on Turkish, Persian or other Islamic Middle Eastern styles. These often have the blue background, which is unusual on Chinese export porcelain, where blue figures on a white ground are the norm in blue and white wares.

Within Estienne's study group of 1874 pieces, the "Persian" family were the most numerous, with 547, then the Chinese with 374, so 921 pieces in Asian styles in total, almost half. Nevers made the first Chinese-style blue and white wares in France, with production running between about 1650 and 1700. Chinese styles would then be taken up by factories in Normandy, especially following the foundation of the French East India Company in 1664.

Much of the painting on pieces with a white ground copies that of Chinese blue and white Transitional porcelain (roughly 1625–90), a good deal of which was exported. Chinese literati figures contemplating nature in a lush garden or landscape is a common subject in both countries, though the French treatments have some differences. Nevers wares often have Chinese-style painting on purely Western shapes of vessel, and also the opposite, Western-style painting on very Chinese shapes.

Unlike other French potteries, especially the porcelain factories of the early 18th century, influence from Japanese export porcelain styles such as Kakiemon is not found in Nevers wares. Estienne sees the decoration à la bougie, with white imitating splashes of candle-wax on a blue ground (see below), as of Chinese inspiration. They compare with some much earlier Song dynasty wares, in particular the "oil-spot" glazes of Jian ware (around the 12th or 13th century), though Estienne is unable to explain how awareness of these could have reached France in the 17th century.

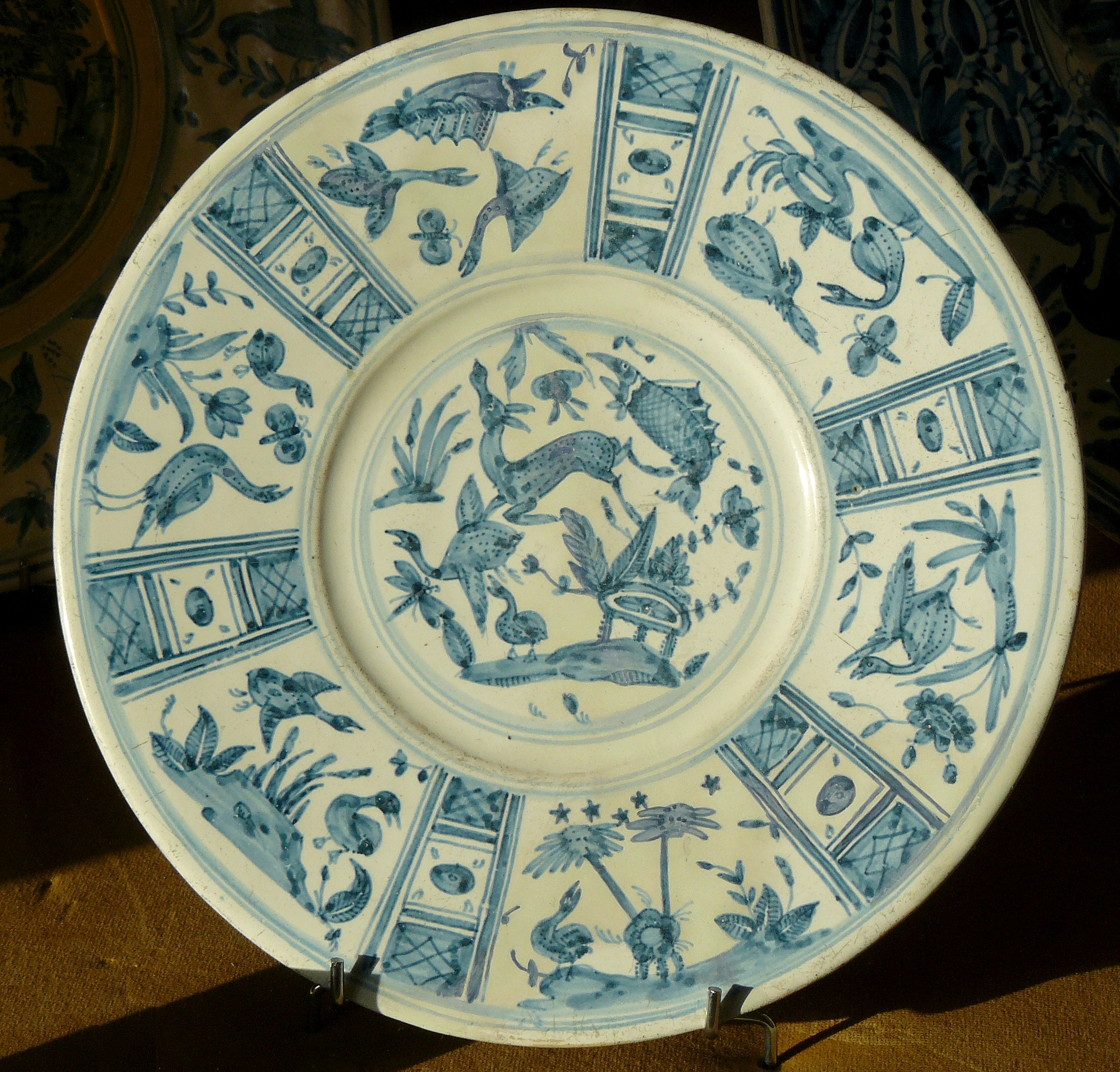
Conrade plate, 1630s, imitating Chinese Kraak ware.

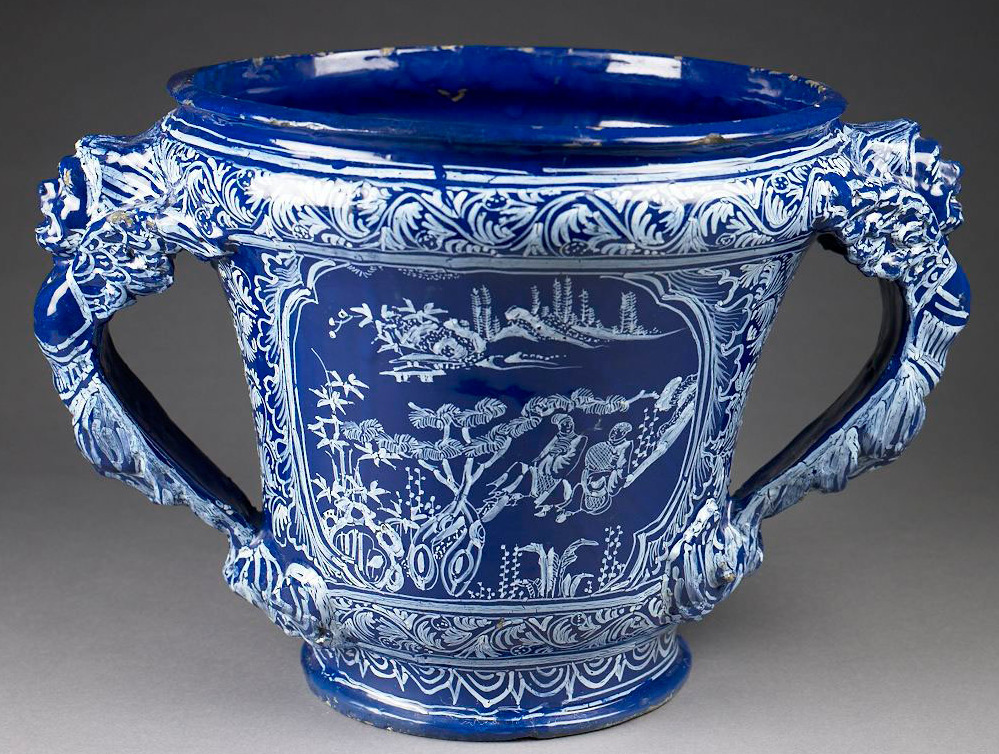
Garden vase, 1660–80; Chinese-style garden scene in white on a blue ground; the shape is entirely European.

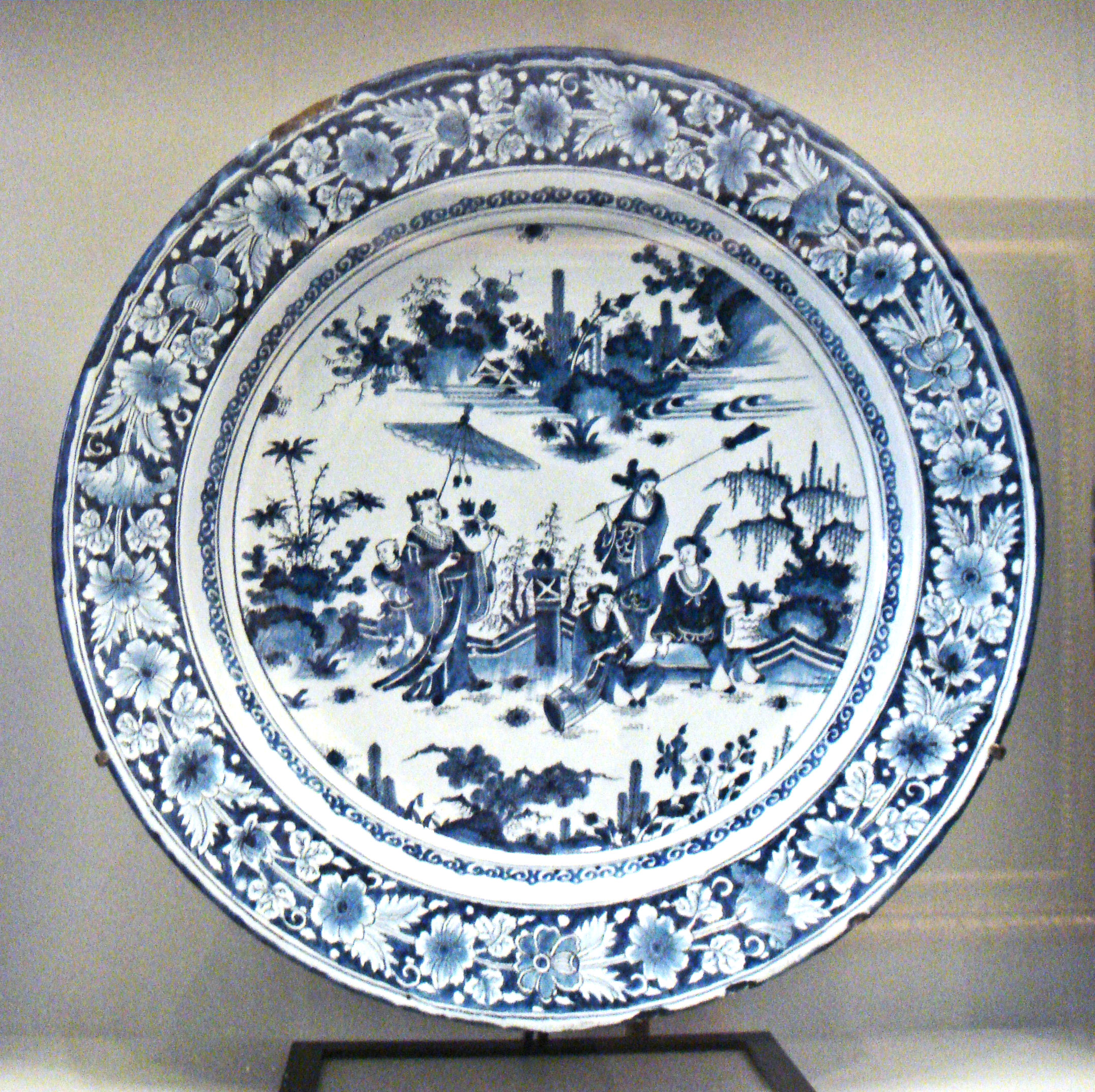
Chinese style, 1680–1700, blue on a white ground.

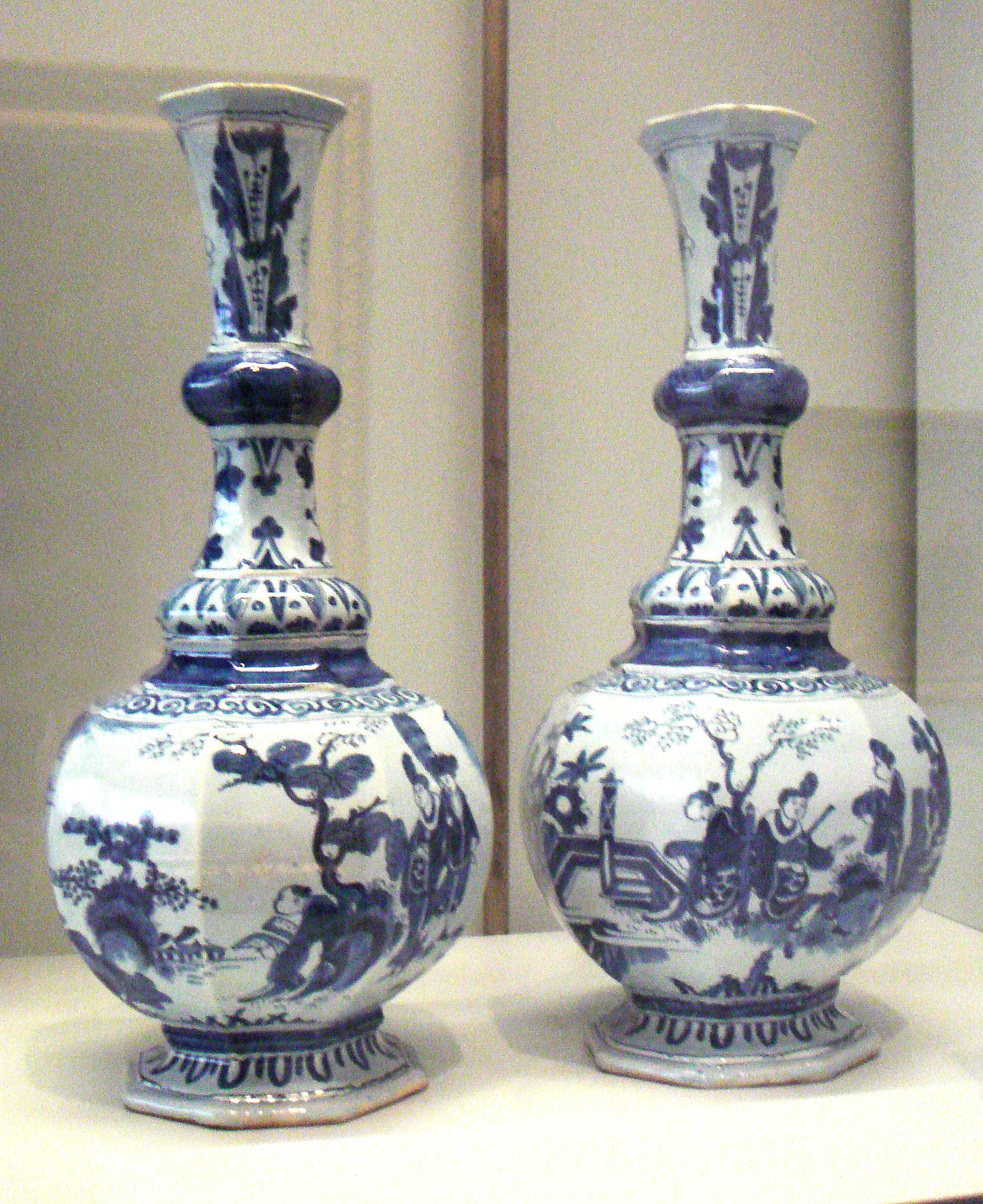
Chinese-style vases, c. 1700

=== Louis XIV Court style ===
After about 1650, Nevers adapted the new French Court style, today called the style Louis XIV, to faience, the extravagant shapes borrowing from metalwork and other decorative arts, and painted scenes after the new generation of court painters such as Simon Vouet and Charles Lebrun, which were also painted in many colours. Both types of source were available to the potters as prints. The pieces were often extremely large and ornate, and apart from garden vases and wine-coolers, no doubt decorative rather than practical.

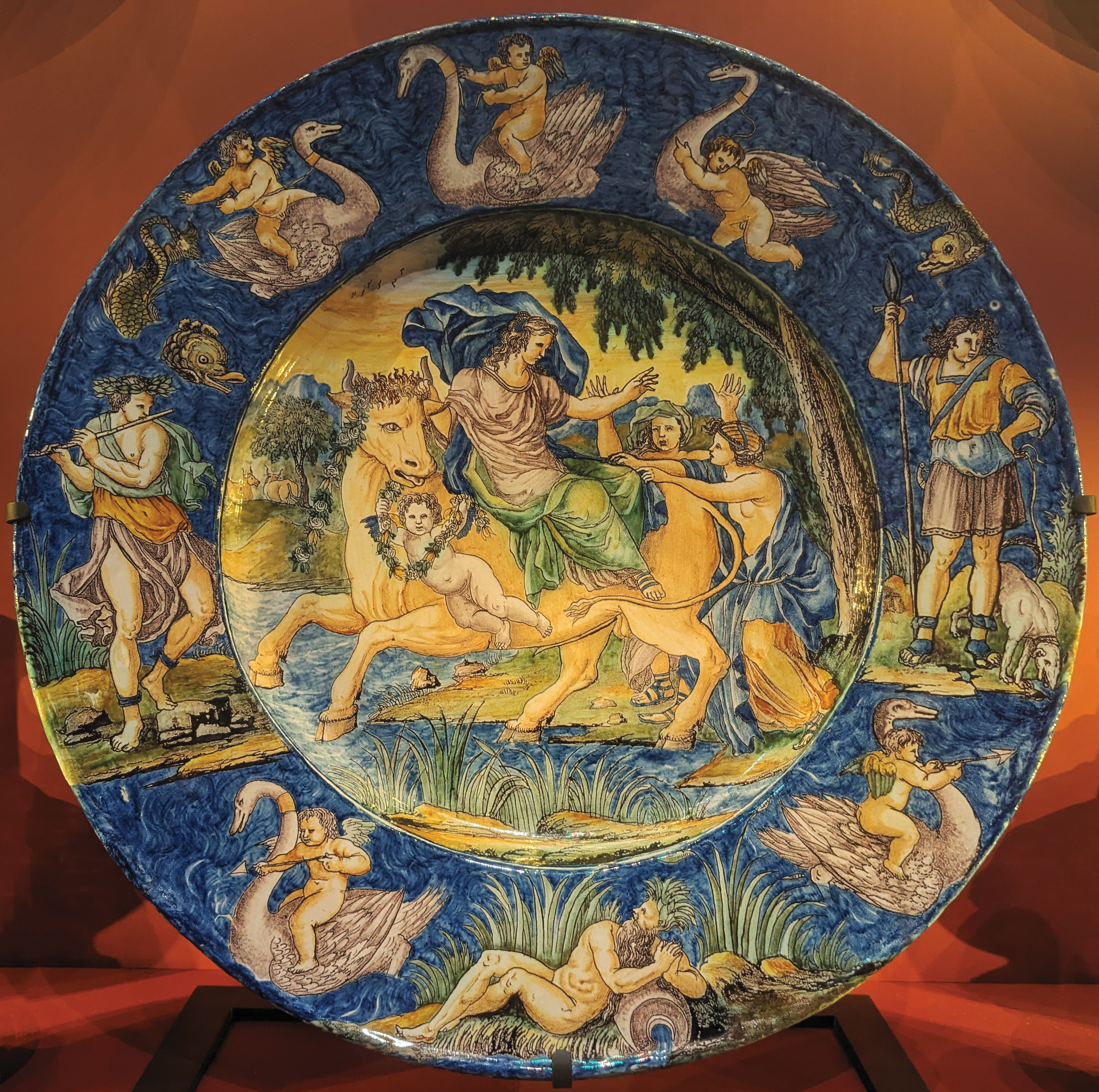
Central dish is 58 cm across, the main scene the Rape of Europa, after an illustration of Ovid by François Chauveau, published in 1674

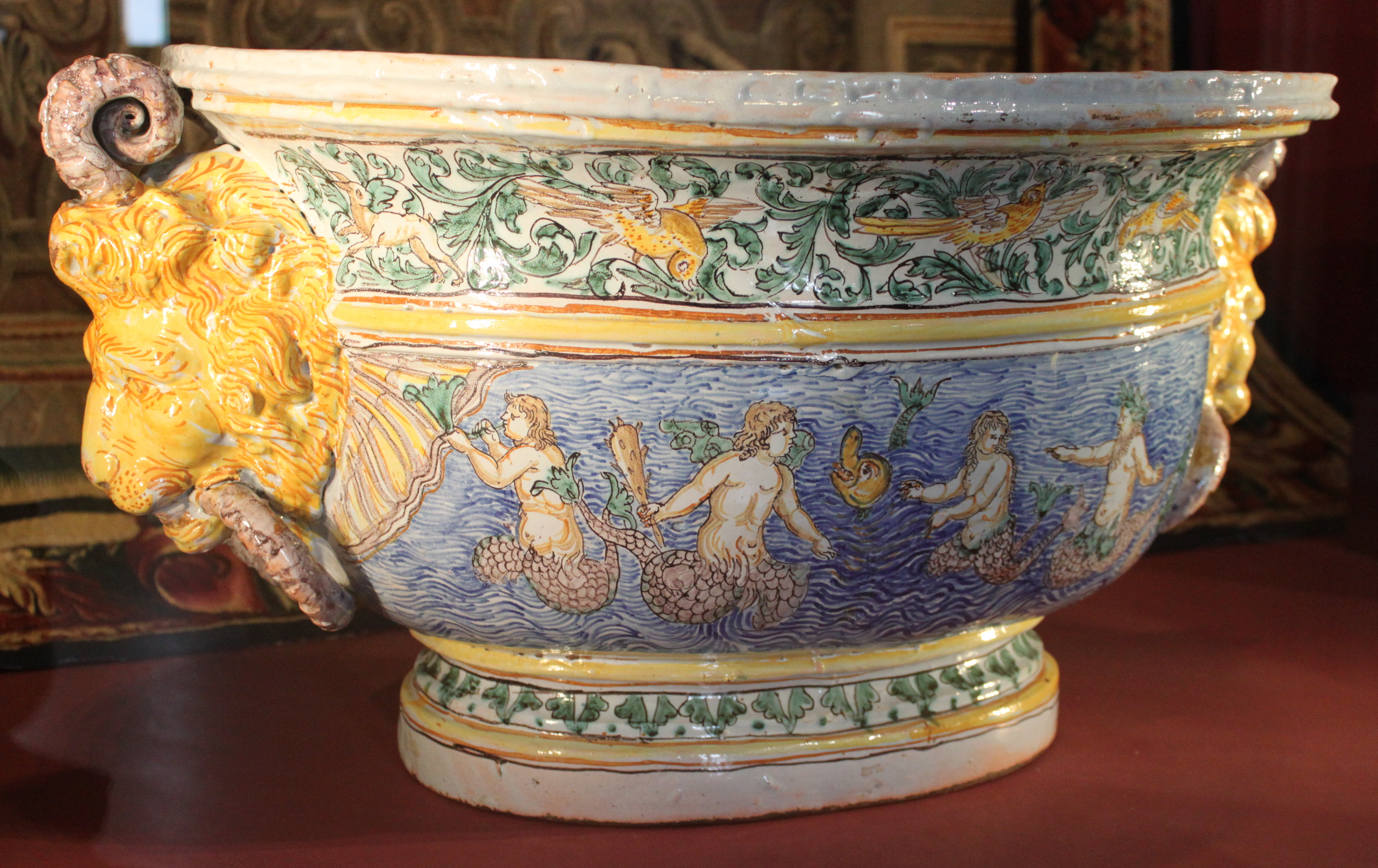
Wine-cooler with The Drunkenness of Bacchus, c. 1680

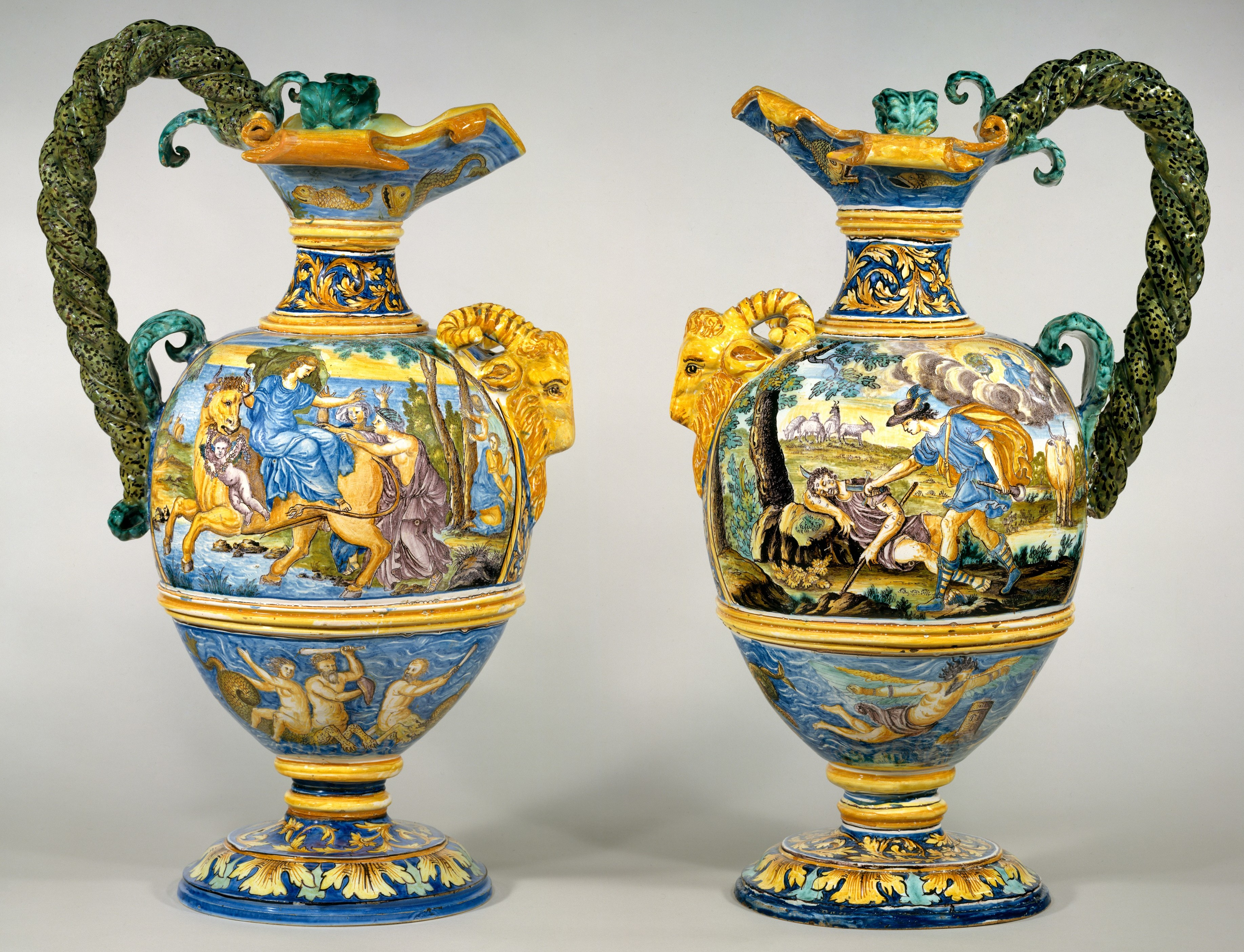
Pair of wine jugs, c. 1685, 56 cm high. François Chauveau's Rape of Europa is again used (left).

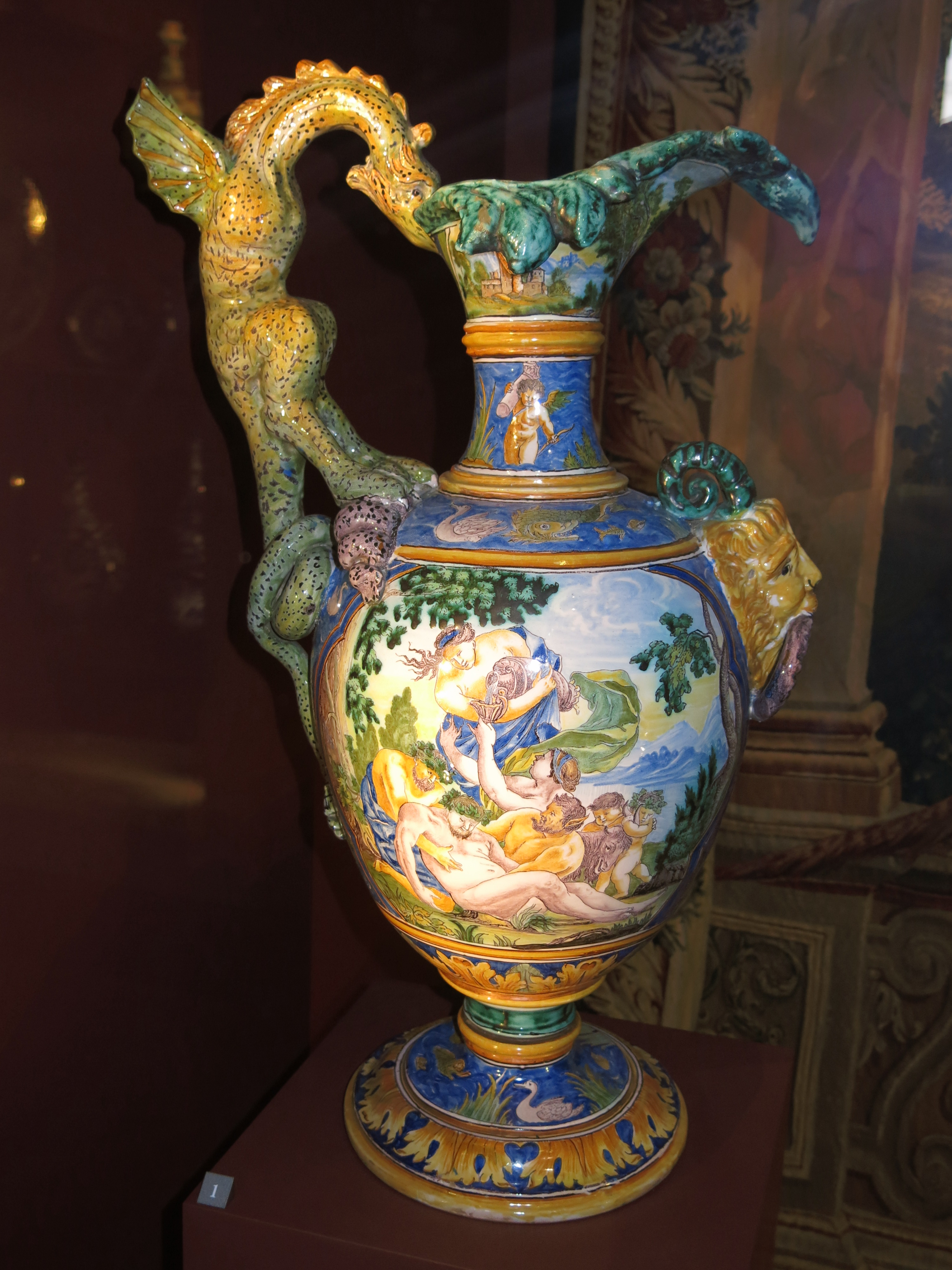
Large ewer with dancing bacchantes and satyrs, 1685

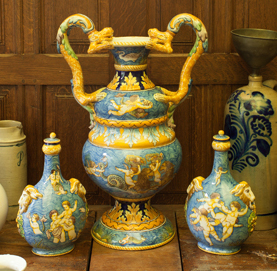
Three Montagnon pieces in the style, after 1900

=== European styles ===
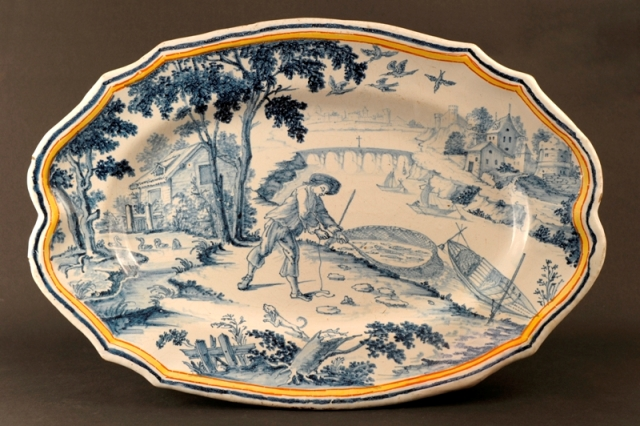
Fisherman on the Loire near Nevers, painted by Claude Guillaume Bigourat (1735–1794), a matching dish has a hunting scene, dated 1758.

Wares were also produced in a wide variety of styles drawing on European sources, and these came to dominate production in the 18th century, as the quality of Nevers wares declined. By around 1730, a "decline of inventiveness at Nevers" becomes apparent, and later Nevers wares mostly copy Rouen faience or the new factories of the south. After about 1750, the European porcelain factories largely replaced Asian exports as the dominant wares at the top of the market, but by this time most Nevers faience was faience populaire, usually cruder, cheaper, and more "popular" in taste. Some armorial wares were produced. Nevers is on the Loire and many pieces have painted images of the local style of river boats, and the long arched bridge over the river.

Painted scenes, rather than floral or ornamental decoration, are usually in a single colour, most often blue and white, but also the "Persian" white on blue, or other colours. In the 17th century a favourite source for scenes with figures was the immensely long pastoral novel or romance L'Astrée by Honoré d'Urfé, published between 1607 and 1627, and possibly the single most influential work of 17th century French literature. The main characters, Astrée and Celadon, spend time disguised as a shepherd and shepherdess, and this is the most popular depiction; very wide hats tend to indicate the pastoral life. These scenes do not seem to take their compositions from prints, even approximately, nor relate to any specific moment in the story. They seem to begin around 1640.

Other scenes show hunting and fishing, often drawing on Flemish prints, and a few specific historical moments. There is a dish with the signing of the Treaty of the Pyrenees in 1659, with portraits of Cardinal Mazarin and Luis de Haro, his Spanish counterpart. Many pieces, and many more borders, mix a range of elements: figures, birds and animals, flowers, and ornamental motifs, typically all at roughly the same size, for example a flower, rabbit, bird and man.

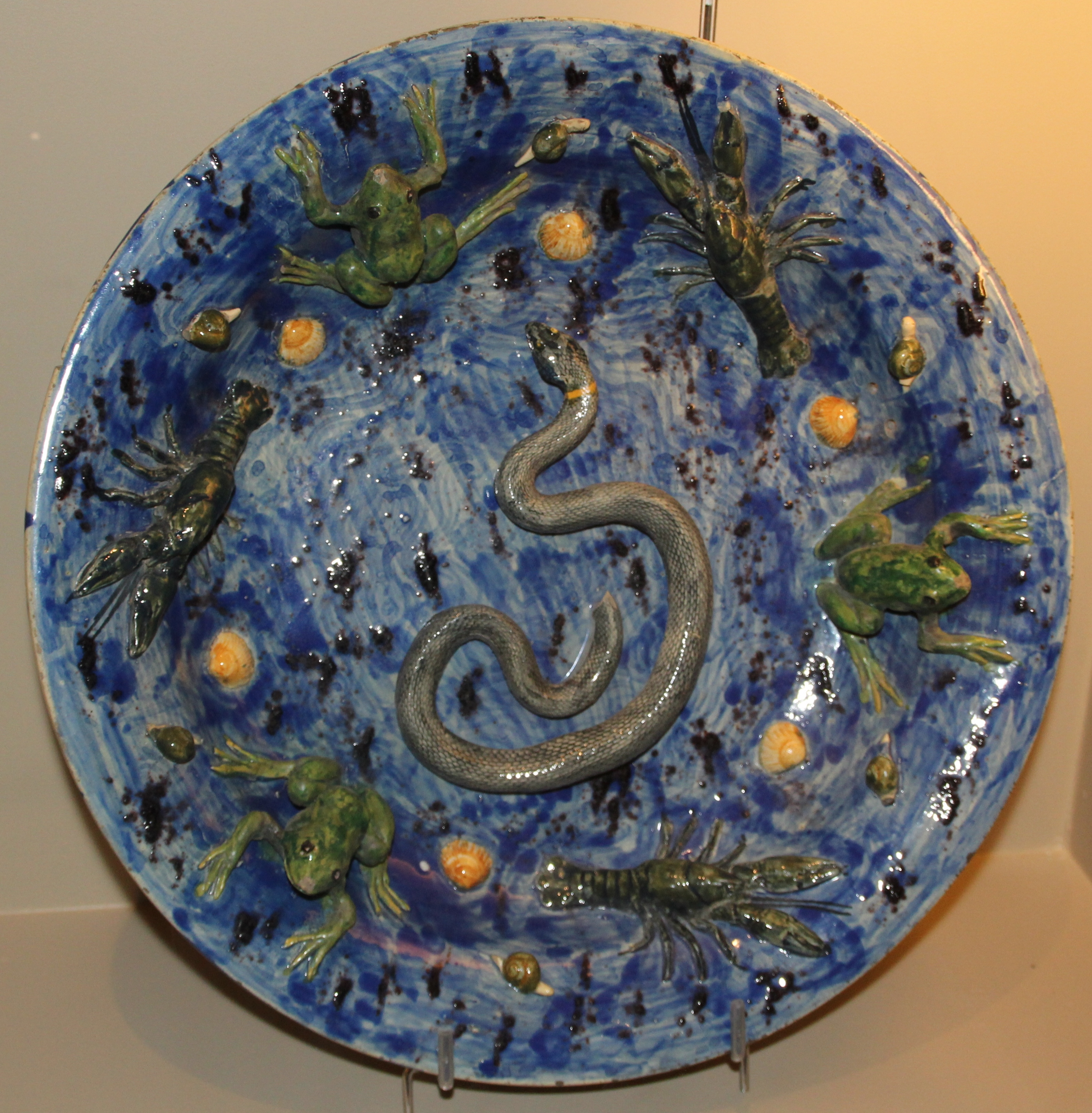
Rare Nevers "Rustic ware" dish, in the style of Bernard Palissy, 1599, by Agostino Conrade

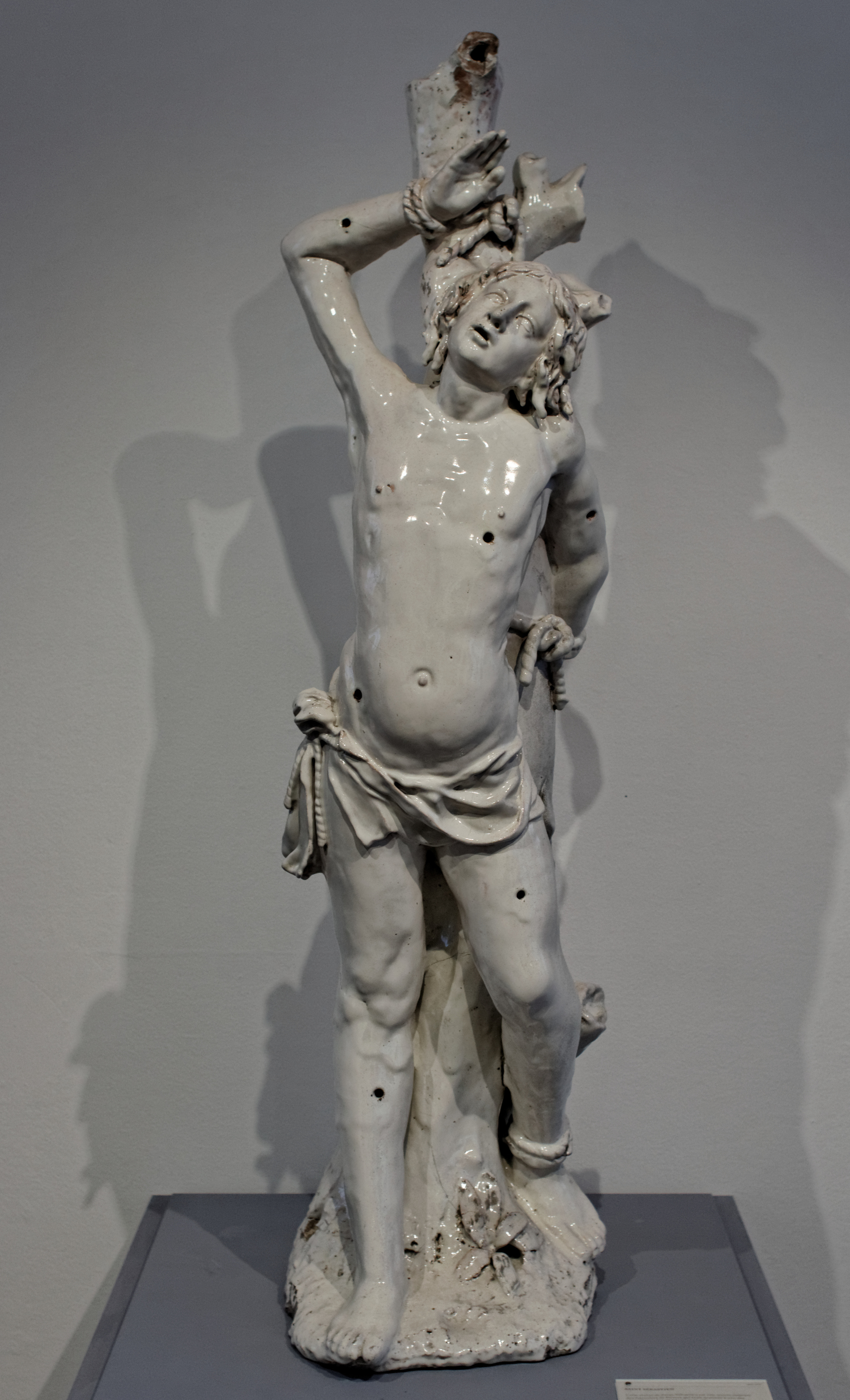
Rare statue of Saint Sebastian, about half life-size, c. 1630

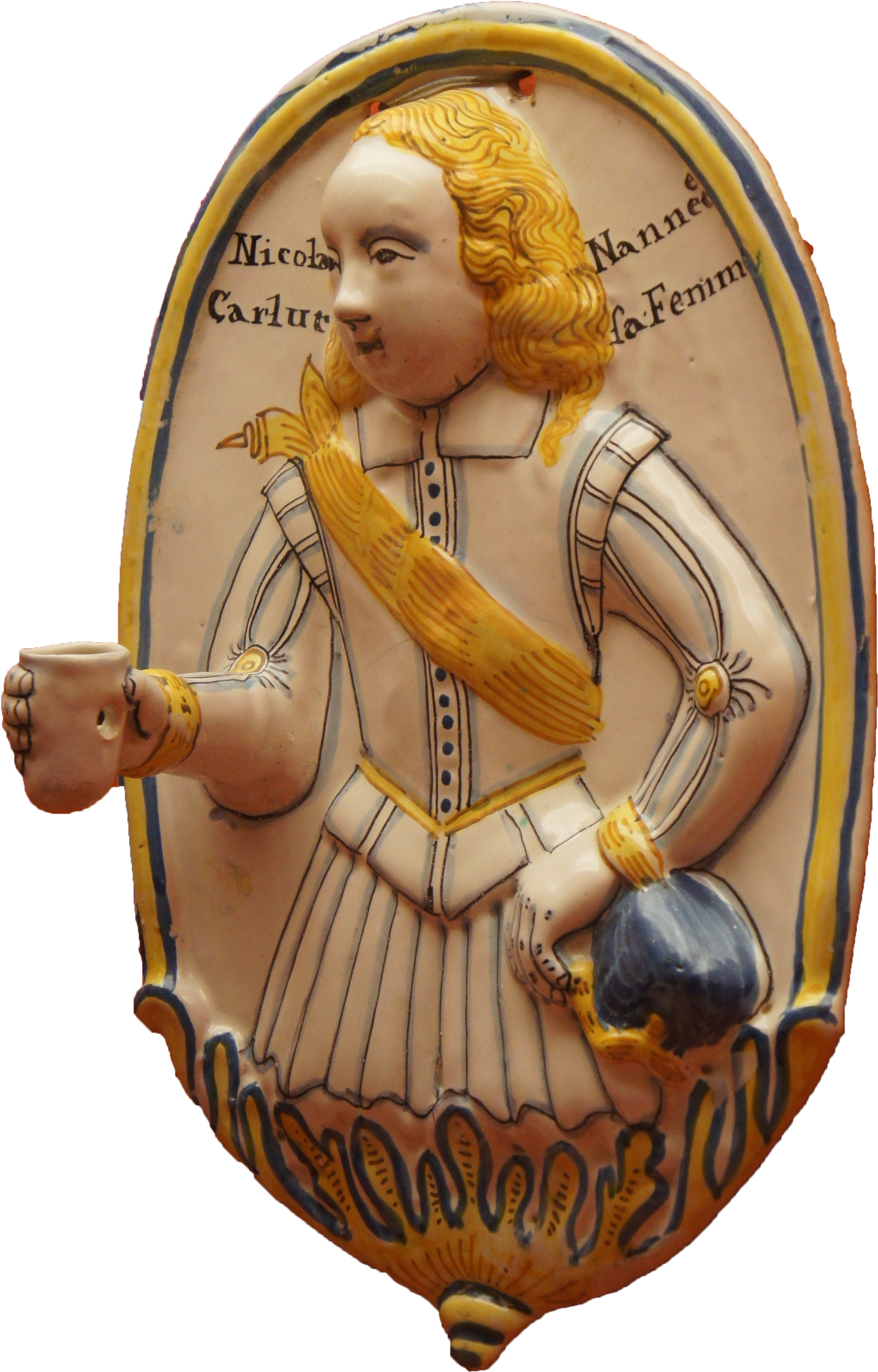
Figure sconce (candleholder)

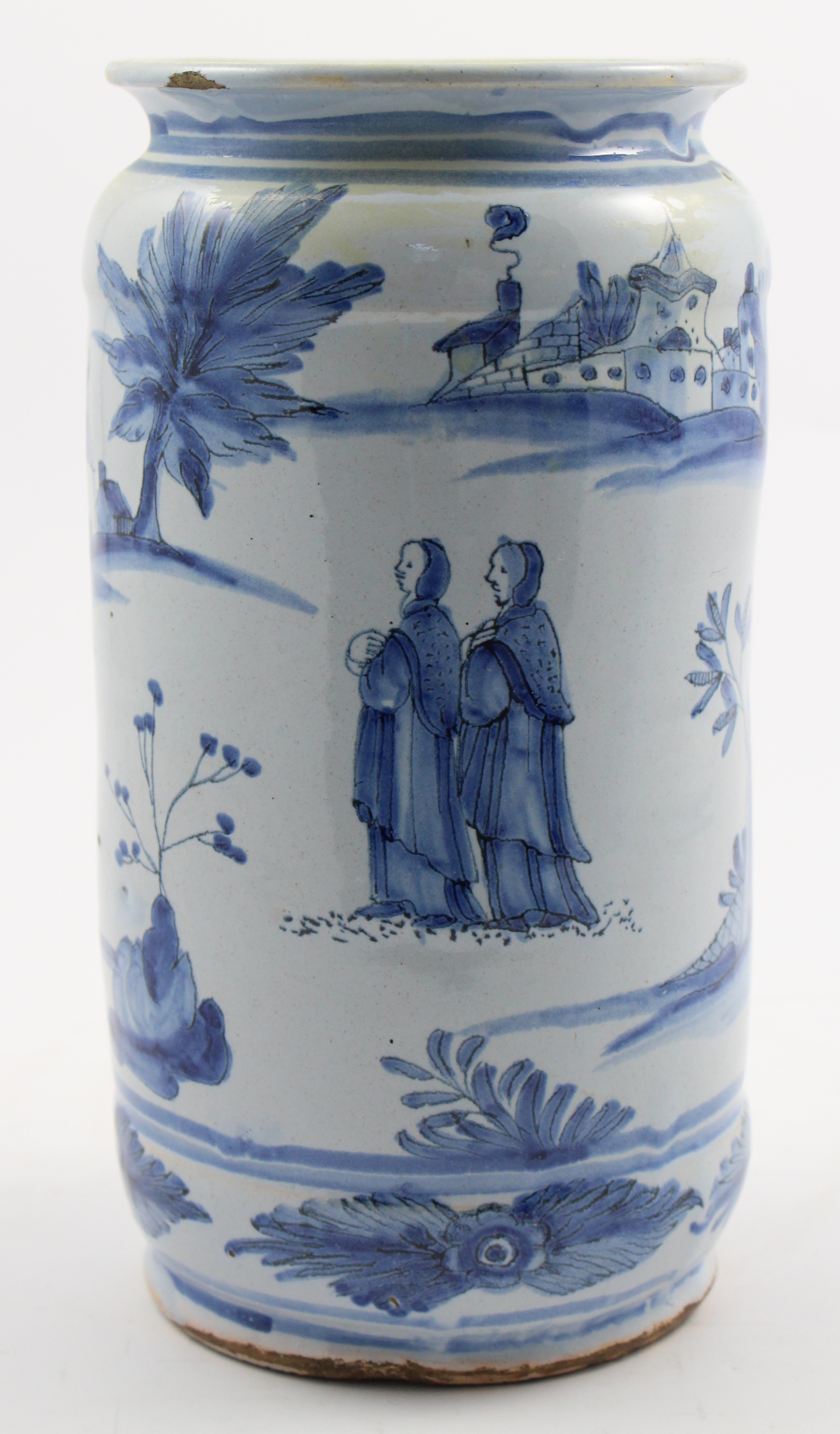
Vase, 1650–1700

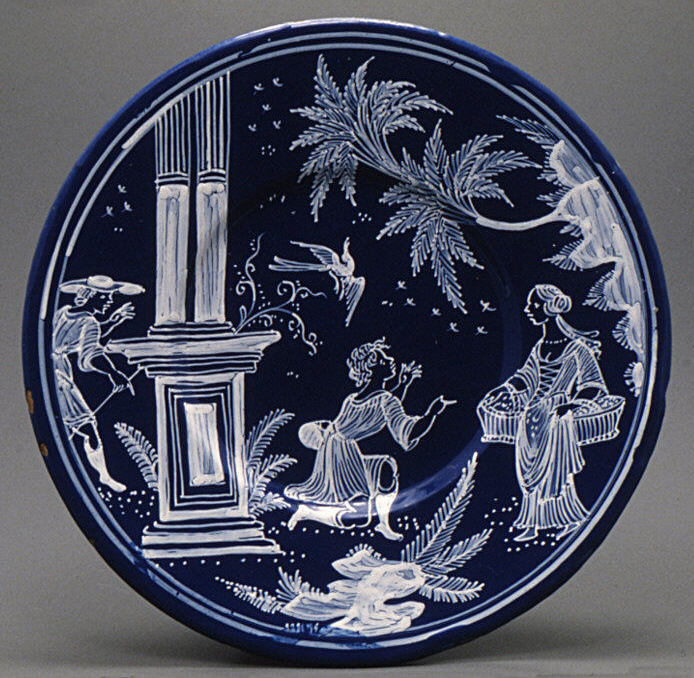
Characters from L'Astrée in the "Persian" white on blue, c. 1675

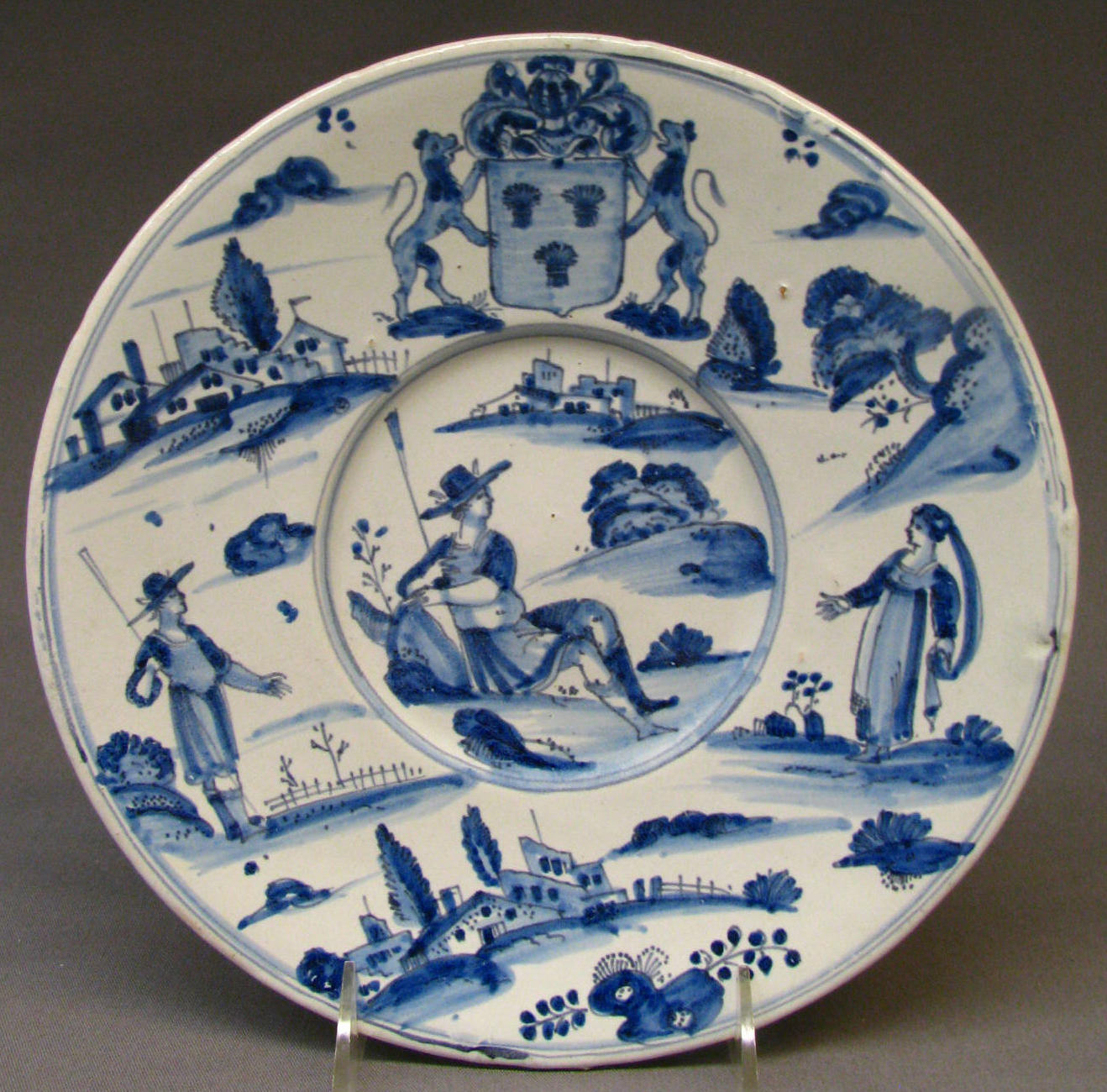
Armorial dish, with characters from L'Astrée, 1650–75

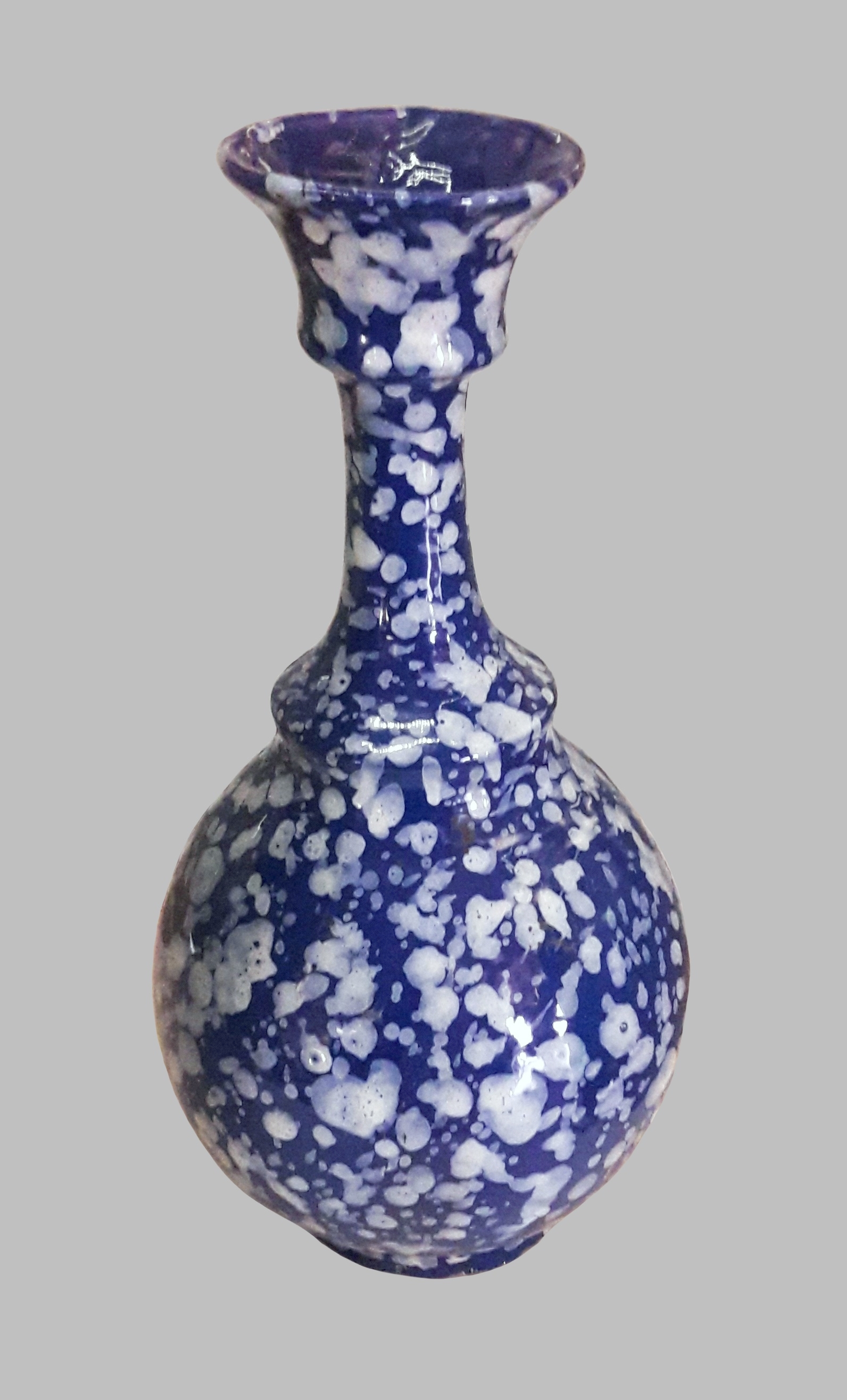
"Candle" style (decoration à la bougie), imitating splashes of candle wax, late 17th century

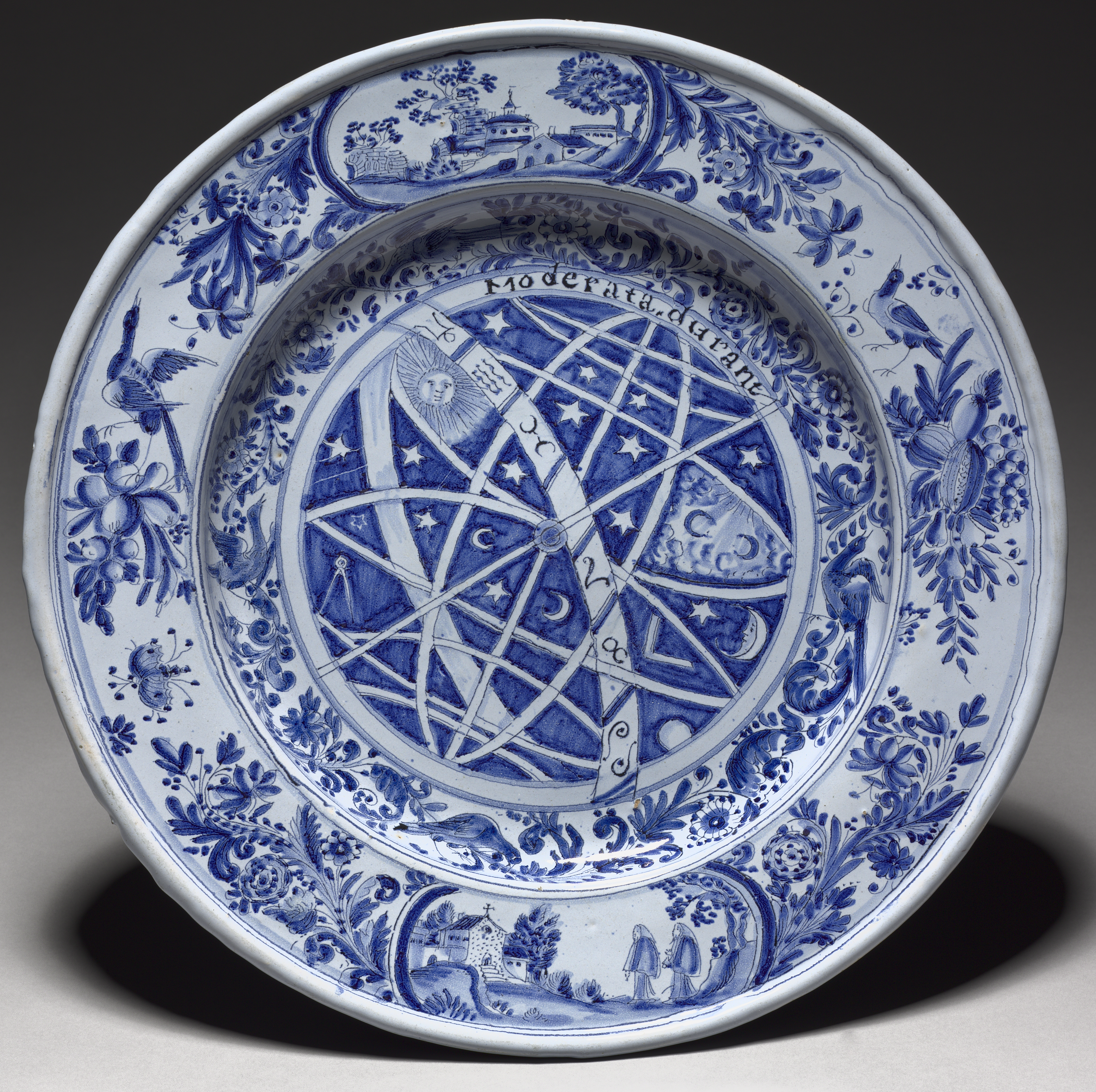
Astrological plate, 44 cm, perhaps with birthchart for "Moderata Durant", late 17th century.

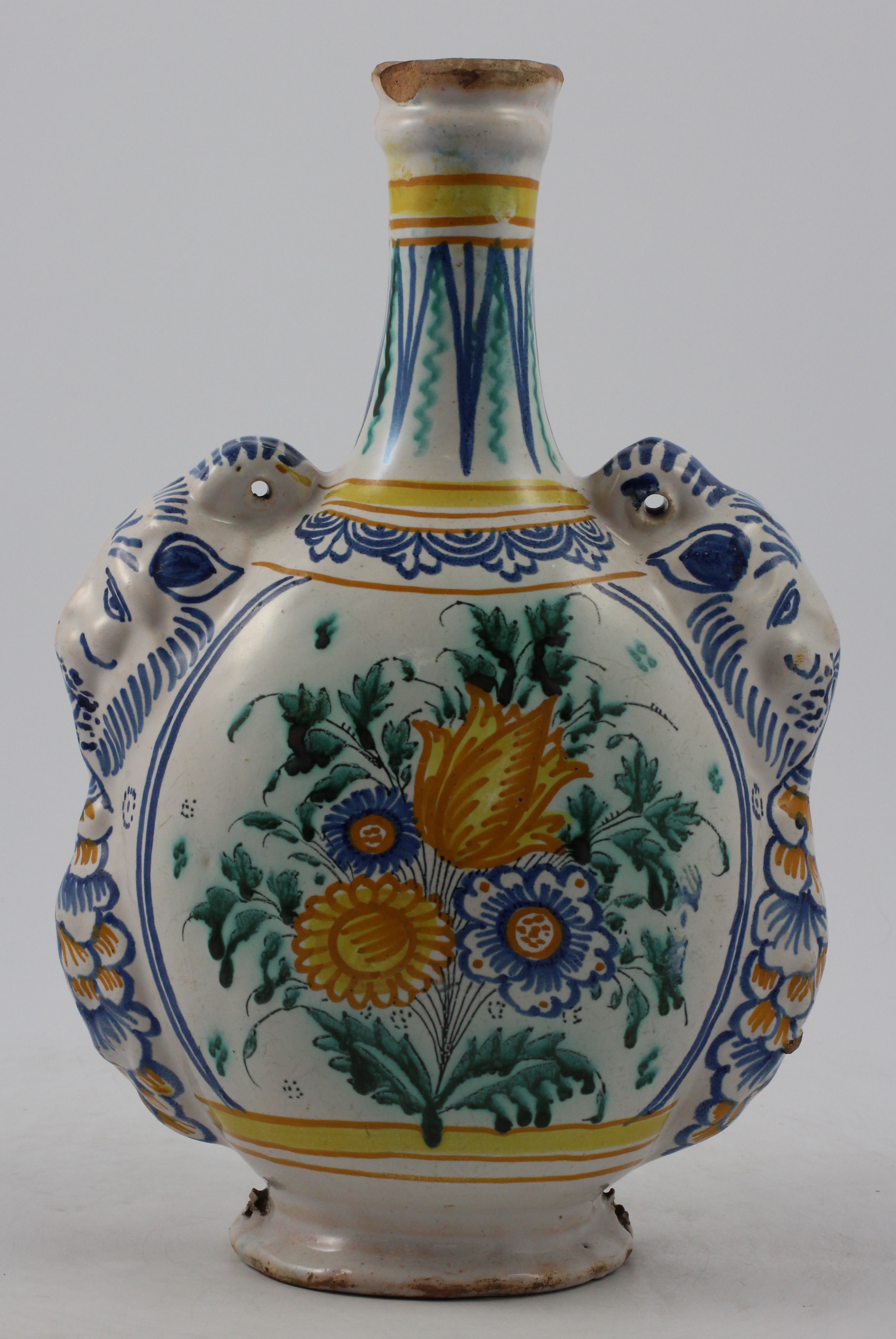
decorative pilgrim flask, 1700–1725

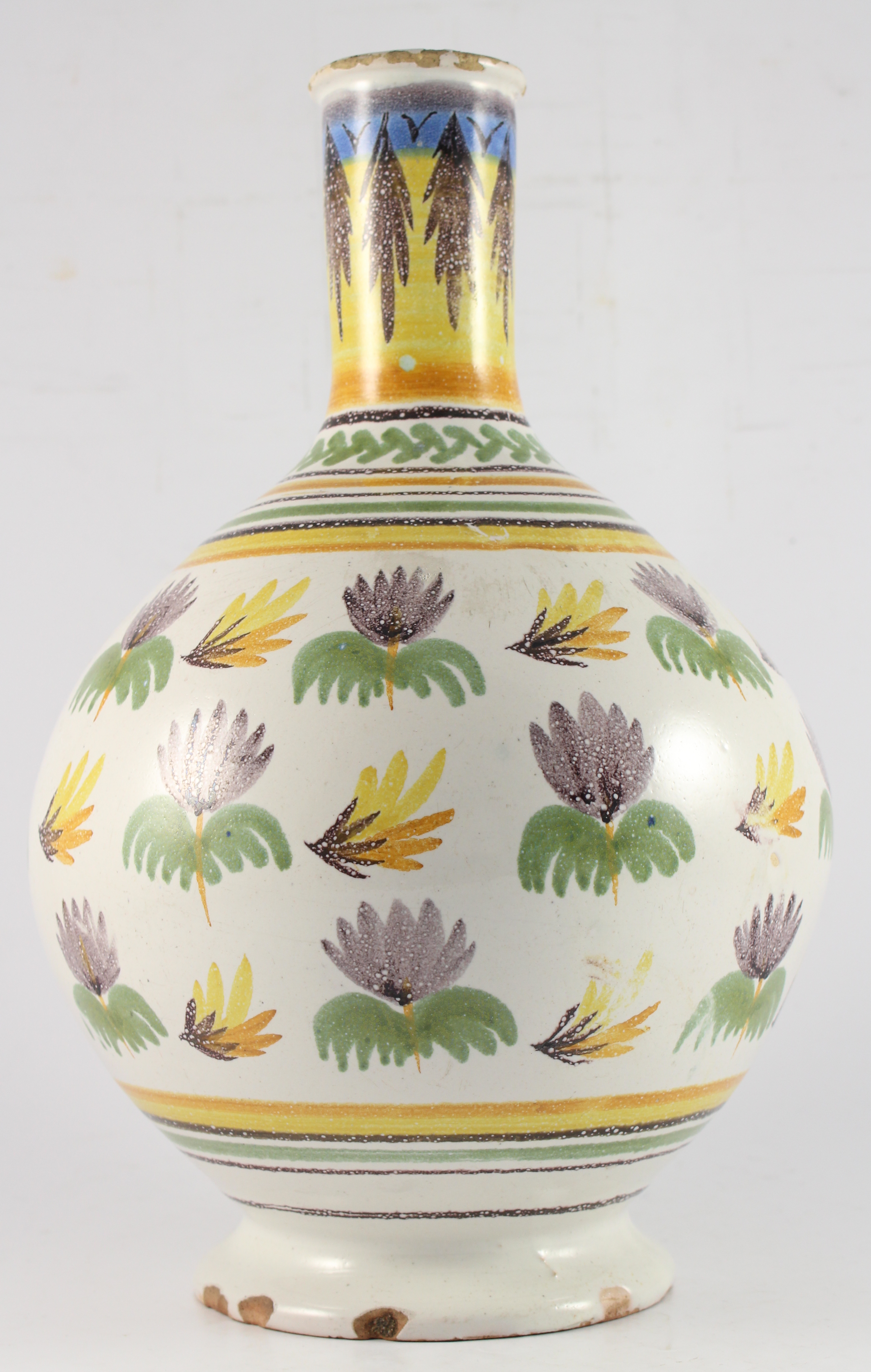
Bottle, c. 1809

=== Faiences parlantes ===
The faiences patriotiques of the Revolutionary period typically have one or two figures in the central section, rather crudely painted in a few colours, with a pro-revolutionary slogan or comment below in black cursive script. The earliest examples included pro-monarchist pieces. The same style had been in use before the Revolution, and continued after it, the wider grouping being called faience populaire or faiences parlantes ("talking faience"). These were more comic or satirical than political. Another type of pieces in this popular style, called faience patronymique, showed the patron saint of the recipient, and were common as christening or birthday gifts. These types were made in other centres, but Nevers was the leading producer.

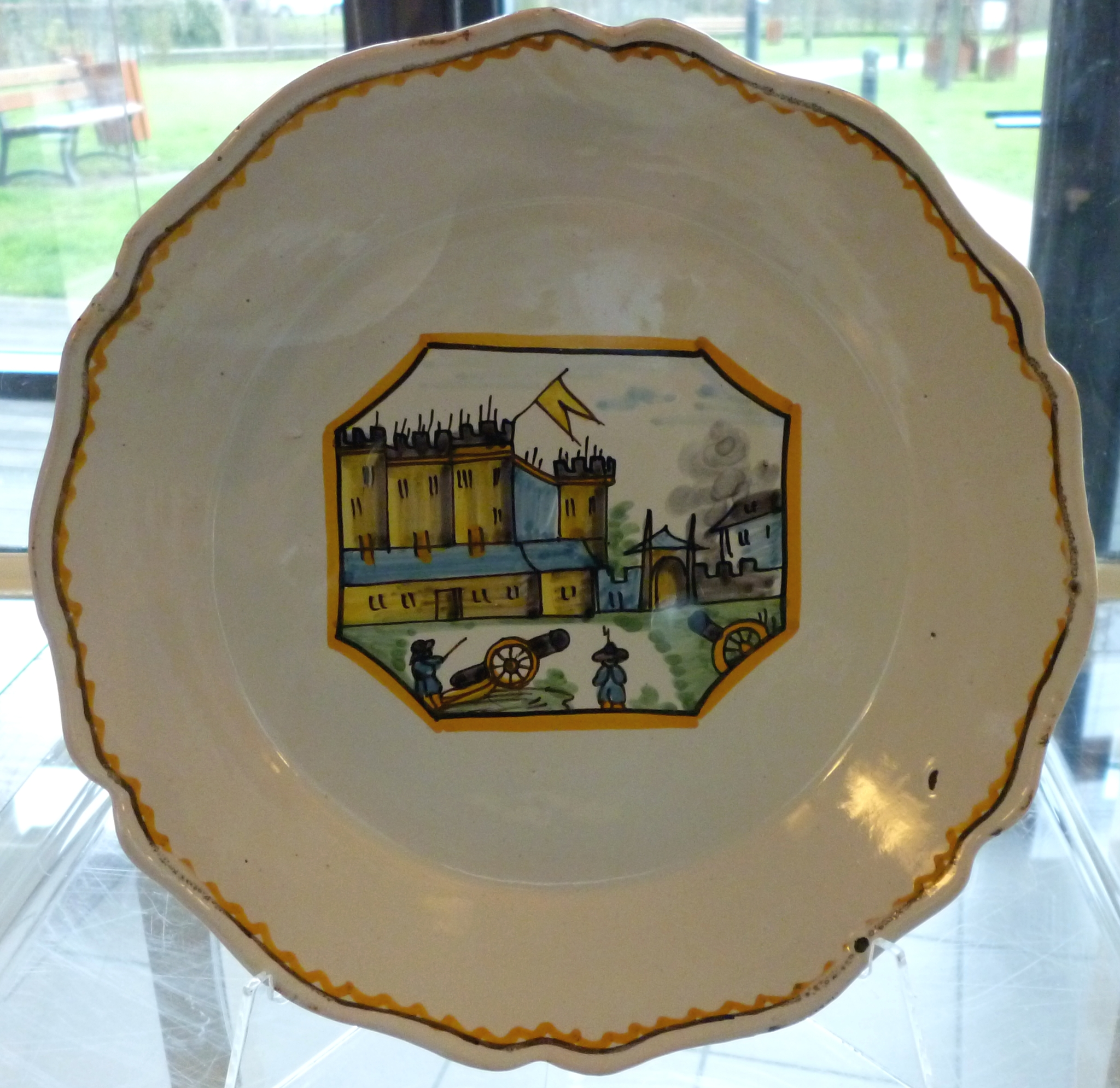
Storming the Bastille, c 1789

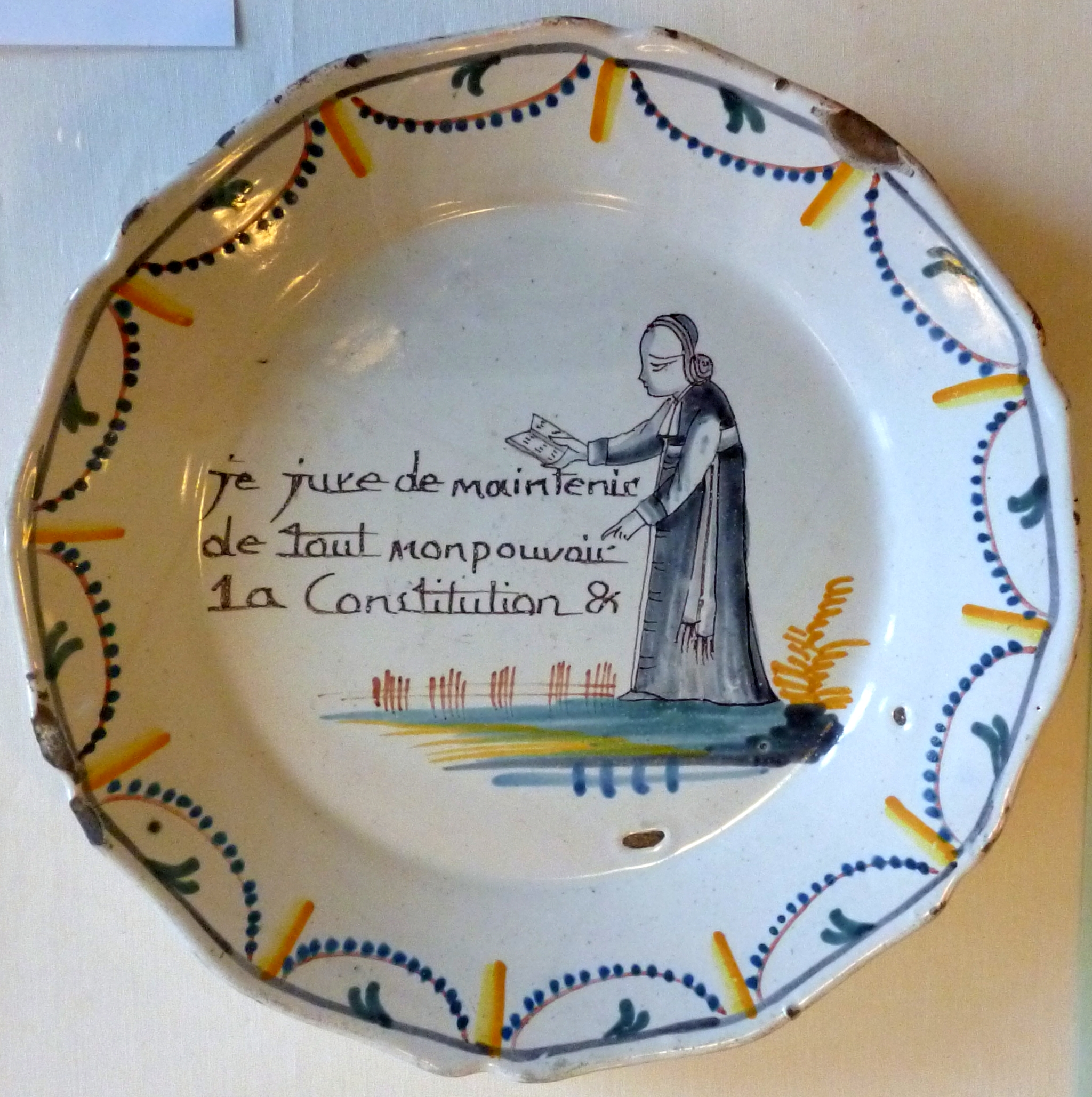
A priest swears "with all my power" to maintain the Constitution; the clergy were made to so swear ("je jure de maintenir de tout mon pouvoir la constitution") in November 1790

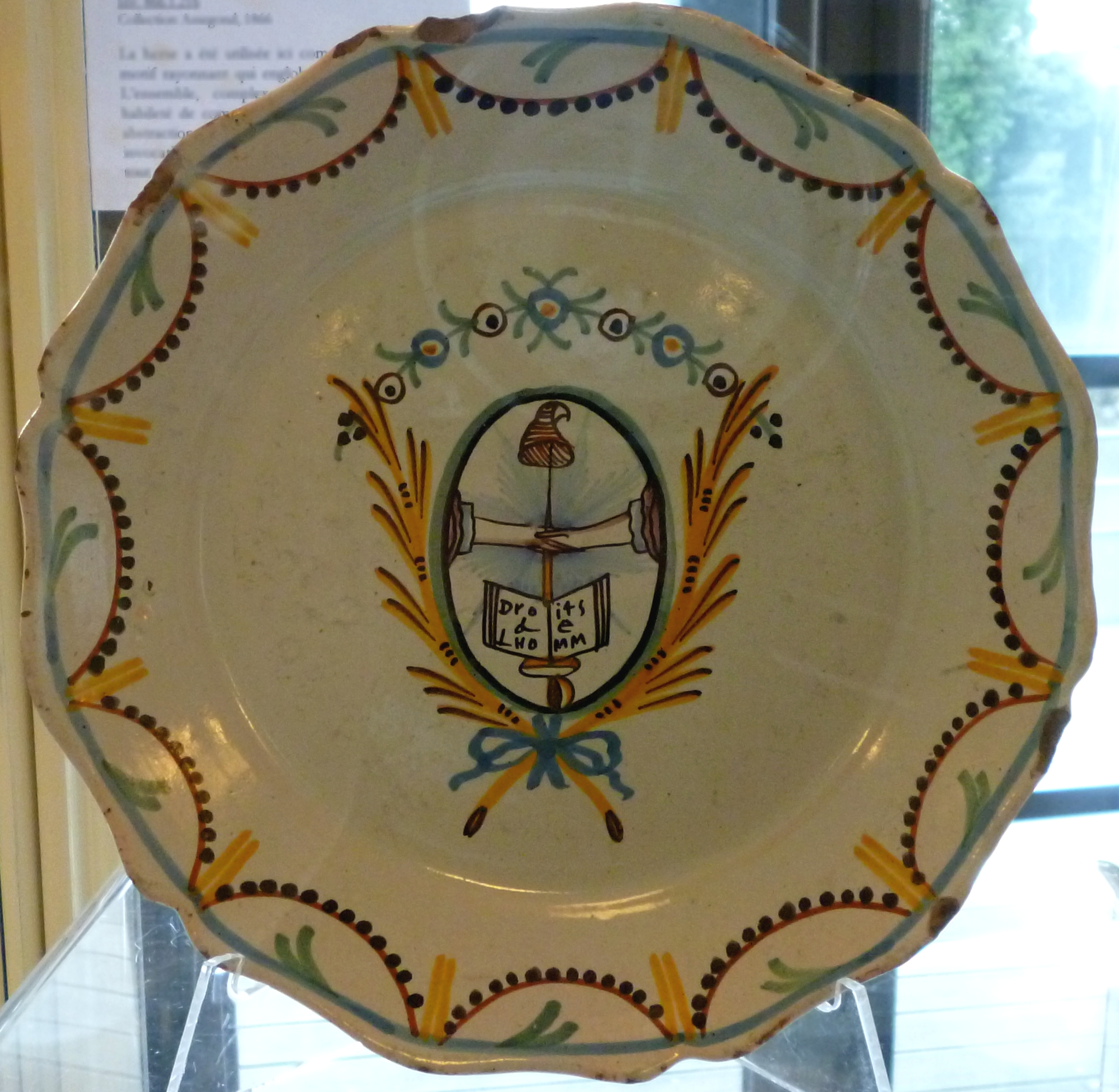
"Rights of Man", c 1790

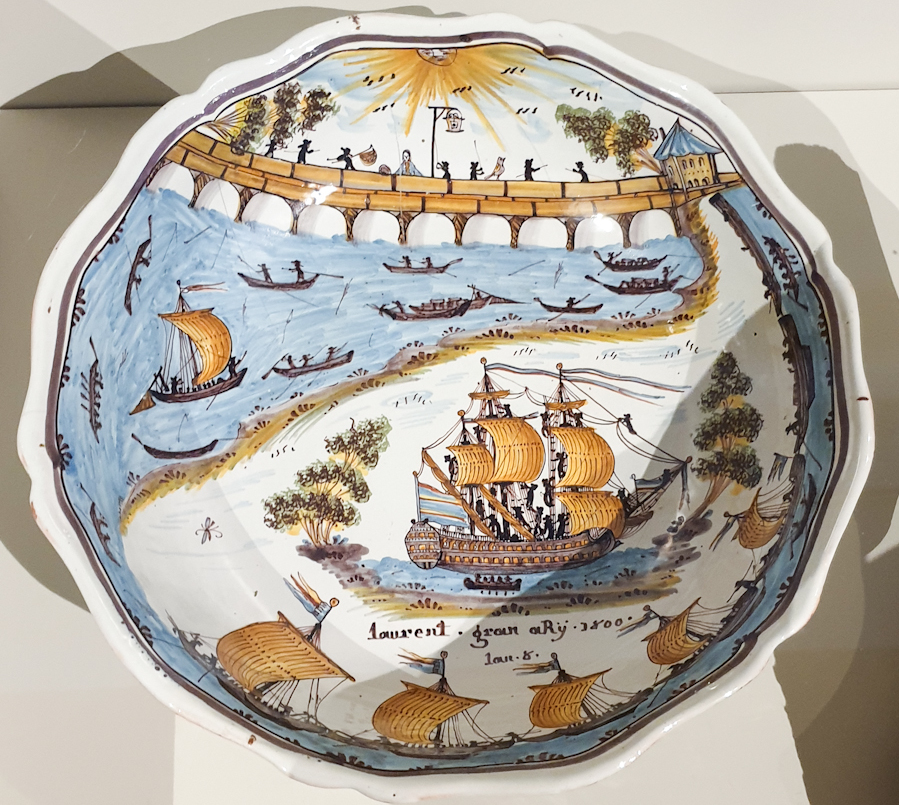
The Loire, with boats and the Nevers bridge, 1800

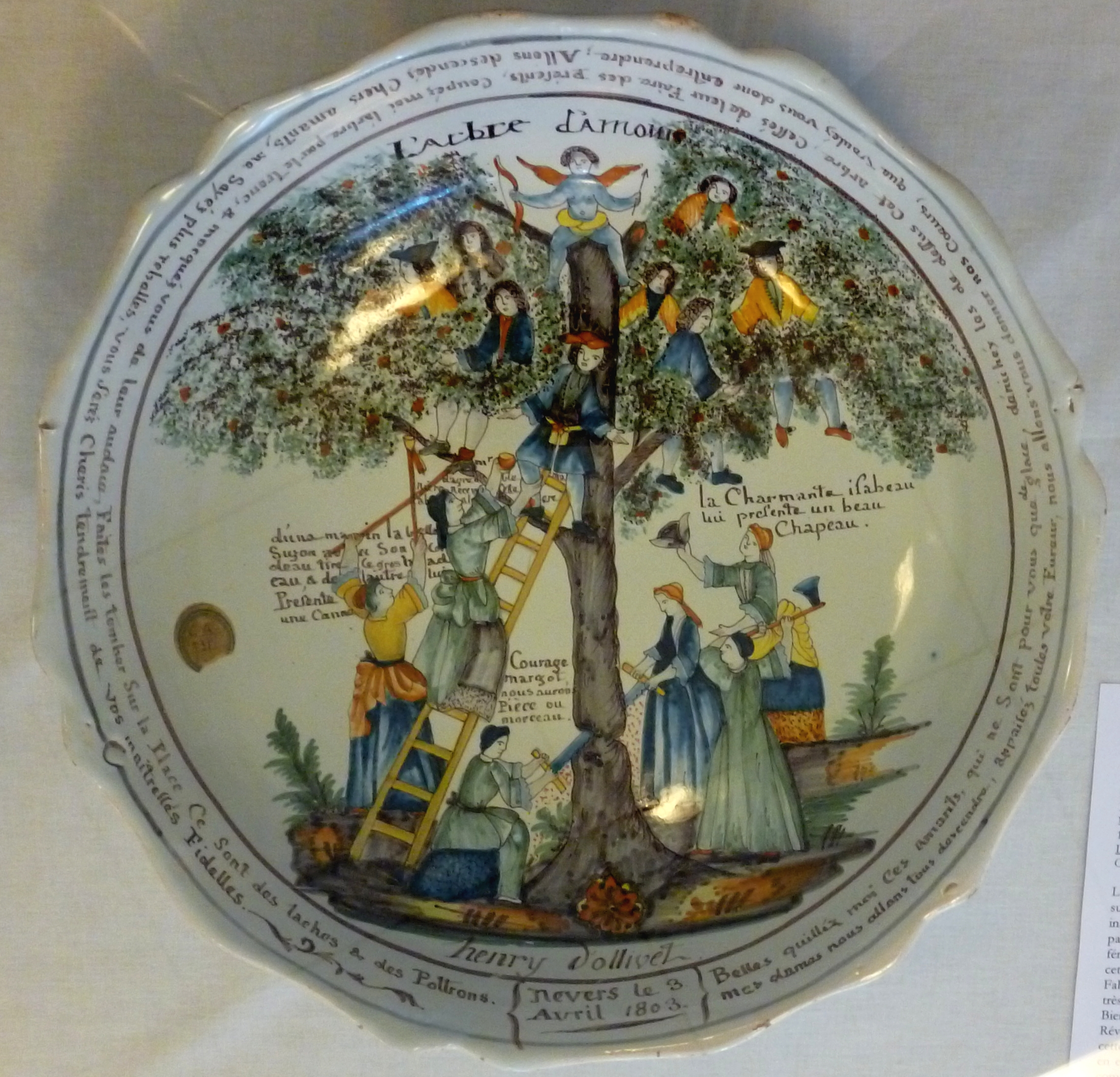
Tree of Love, a complex comic subject, 1803; the men are trying to hide from the women, a popular 18th century subject

== Collections ==
Estienne's group of 17th-century pieces included 227 in the Nevers museum, 179 at Sèvres, and 116 in the Château de Saumur. The Louvre had 49 pieces, but of the highest quality. J. P. Morgan collected Nevers wares, and had bought the collection of Gaston Le Breton (1845–1920), a leading art historian of the subject. Morgan left most of his "vast collections" to the Metropolitan Museum of Art in New York (accessioned in 1917), including a number illustrated here. Most other major ceramic collections have examples, for example the Victoria and Albert Museum in London has over 60.

== See also ==
- Orientalism in early modern France
