= Lambrequin =

Lambrequin is a French word for various applications of textiles. and in English may refer to:

- An ornamental motif, especially associated with French Rouen faience of c. 1690 to 1750
- Mantling in heraldry
- Lambrequin arch, an architectural element
- In interior design (North America only), types of pelmet or valances, hangings around beds or windows
