= Pierre II d'Urfé =

French lord

Pierre II, lord of Urfé (seigneur d'Urfé) (died 10 October 1508, la Bâtie) was a French lord in the county of Forez at the end of the 15th century and the beginning of the 16th century. He fought for the French feudal lords against the king of France before changing sides to support the king. His castle was that of la Bâtie.

== Life ==
From a very young age he was part of the court of Charles, Duke of Berry (1446–1472), then duke of Normandy and Guyenne, before moving to that of Charles the Bold, then count of Charolais and duke of Burgundy, two years later in 1465. Charles the Bold sent him as ambassador to the duke of Guyenne and on Charles the Bold's death in 1477 he left to fight the Ottoman Empire in the Balkans. He then served Francis II, Duke of Brittany, who in 1480 sent him as ambassador to pope Sixtus IV. Next he moved to serve Pierre II de Beaujeu, duke of Bourbon and count of Forez, married to Anne of France, sister of Charles VIII of France, who helped him regain his place in the royal court in 1483. He was then named grand écuyer de France then king's privy councilor. He took the oath in 1484 and became seneschal of Beaucaire.

He fought in Flanders in 1486 but was captured. After being freed he became bailiff of Forez, then successfully took part in the negotiations which led to Charles VIII's marriage to duchess Anne of Brittany. On 4 December 1487 he married Catherine de Polignac. After her death in 1493, he married Antoinette de Beauvau († 1539) on 4 October 1495 - they had one child, the future diplomat and soldier Claude d'Urfé.

After Charles VIII's death and Louis XII's accession and marriage to Anne of Brittany, he had to go into exile for unknown reasons. He joined the court of Ferdinand II of Aragon but pope Alexander VI's intervention allowed him to be pardoned by the French king in 1503 and return to France.

== Bibliography ==
- La Bastide d'Urfé en Forez
