= Masseot Abaquesne =

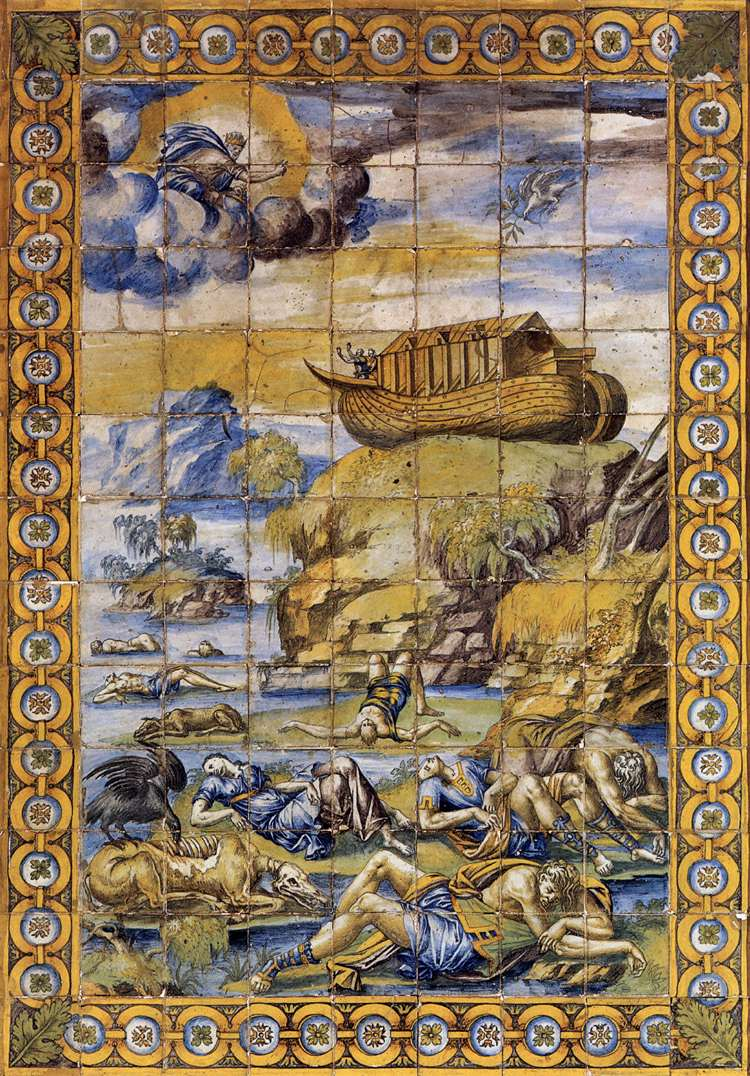
Le Déluge, embarquement sur l'Arche, by Masséot Abaquesne (1550), exhibited in the Musée national de la Renaissance d Écouen.

Masseot Abaquesne (c. 1500-1564) was a manufacturer of Rouen faience, in France between 1535 and 1557. He was the maker of the remarkable paving in the Chateau de Ecouen, which has been attributed both to Luca della Robbia and Bernard Palissy. He also made a large number of pharmacy jars.
