= Sinceny manufactory =

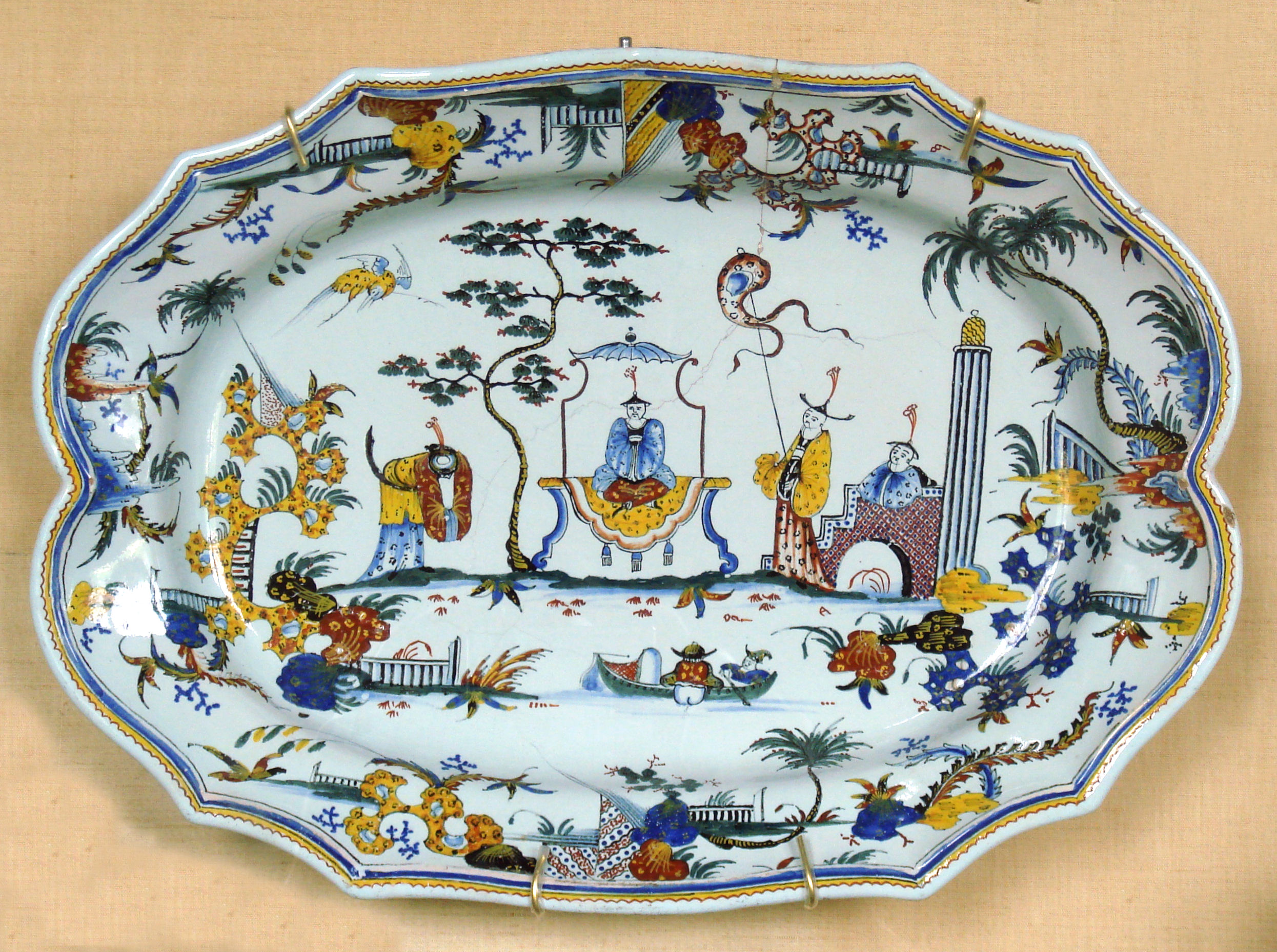
Sinceny faience, 18th century

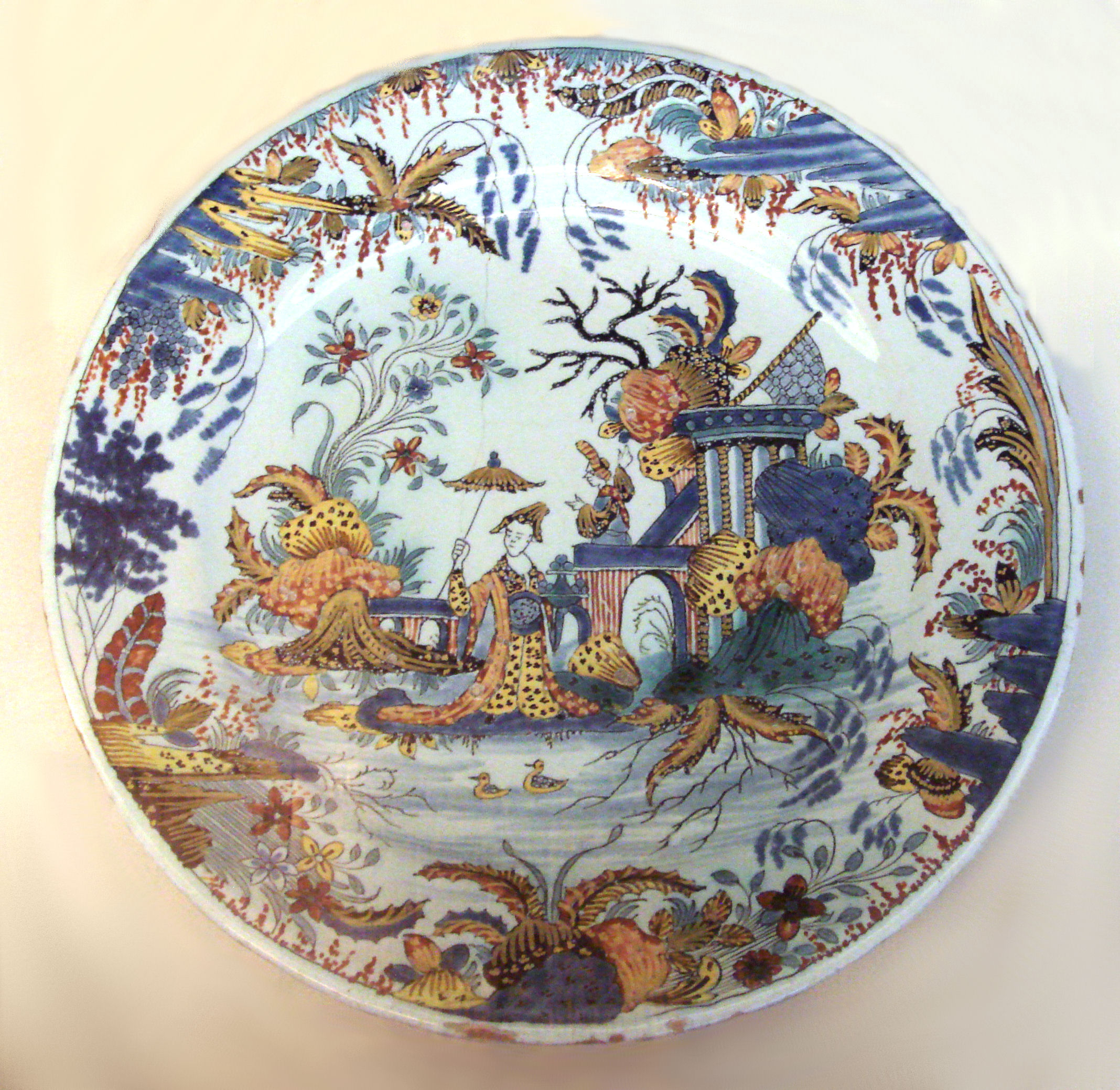
Sinceny faience plate with Chinese scene, 1740-1760

The Sinceny manufactory (sometimes St. Cenis) was a French producer of ceramics, especially faience, located in the village of Sinceny, Picardy, in northern France.

The Sinceny manufactory was founded in 1713, when potters from Rouen and before from Nevers, moved there to establish their own venture. As a consequence, Sinceny ware copied Rouen ceramics to the point of being sometimes indistinguishable from it.

== See also ==
- Orientalism in early modern France
