= Sinceny =

- Commune
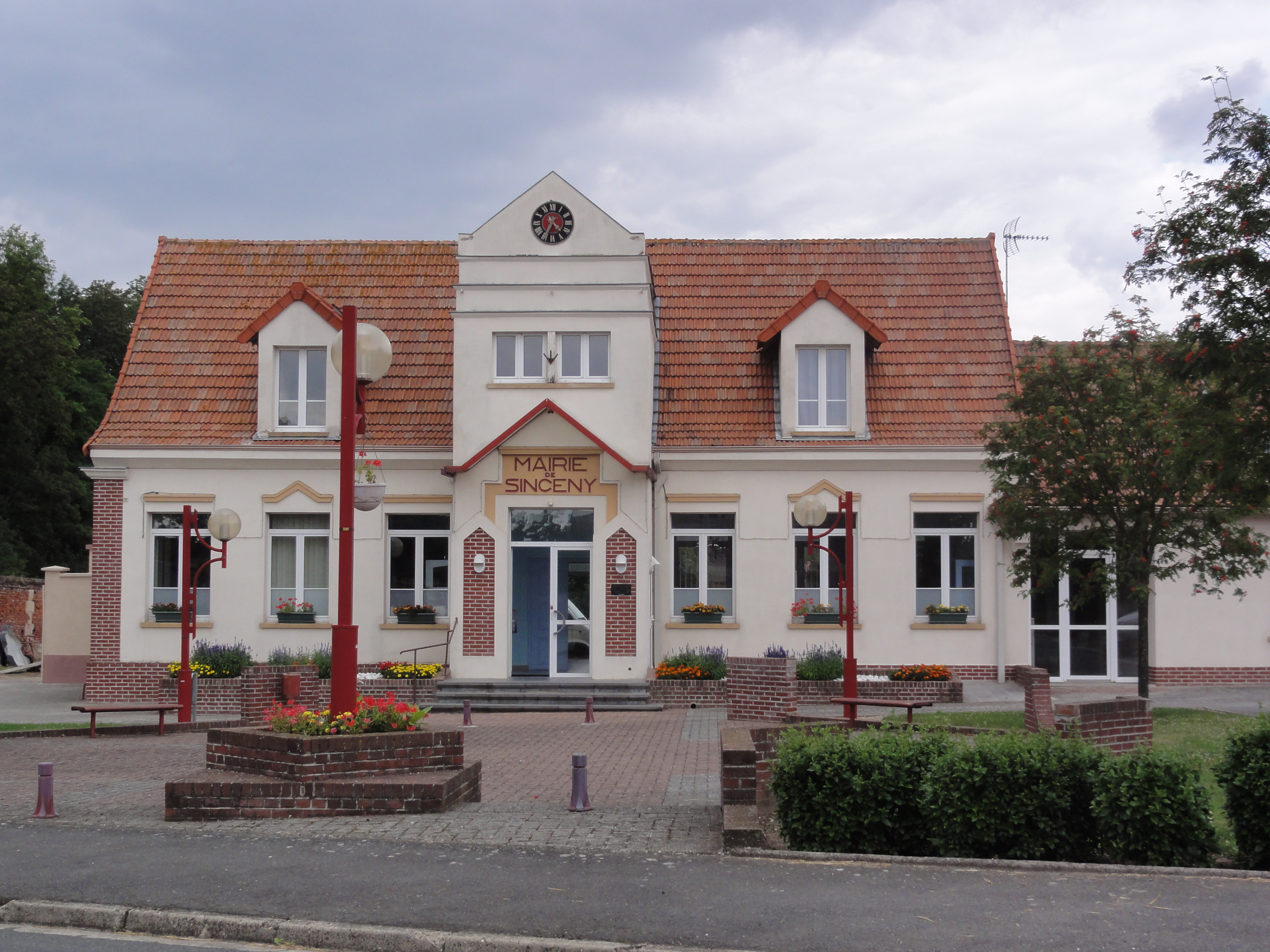
- The town hall of Sinceny

- Coat of arms
- Location of Sinceny
- Location within France Location within Hauts-de-France
- Coordinates: 49°35′49″N 3°14′50″E
- Country: France
- Region: Hauts-de-France
- Department: Aisne
- Arrondissement: Laon
- Canton: Chauny
- Intercommunality: CA Chauny Tergnier La Fère

Government
  - Mayor (2026–32): Fabienne Marchionni
- Area^{1}: 13.13 km^{2} (5.07 sq mi)
- Elevation: 70 m (230 ft)
- Highest elevation: 113 m (371 ft)
- Lowest elevation: 42 m (138 ft)
- Population (2023): 2,005
  - Density: 152.7/km^{2} (395.5/sq mi)
- Time zone: UTC+01:00 (CET)
  - Summer (DST): UTC+02:00 (CEST)
- INSEE/Postal code: 02719 /02300
- ^{1} French Land Register data, which excludes lakes, ponds, glaciers > 1 km^{2} (0.386 sq mi or 247 acres) and river estuaries.

Sinceny (French pronunciation: [sɛ̃sni]) is a commune in the Aisne department in Hauts-de-France in northern France.

== Population ==
Historical population
Year	Pop.	±% p.a.
1968	2,273	—
1975	2,349	+0.47%
1982	2,221	−0.80%
1990	2,078	−0.83%
1999	2,158	+0.42%
2007	2,151	−0.04%
2012	2,088	−0.59%
2017	2,040	−0.46%
2023	2,005	−0.29%
Source: INSEE

== See also ==
- Communes of the Aisne department
- Sinceny manufactory
