= Claude d'Urfé =

French royal official (1501–1558)

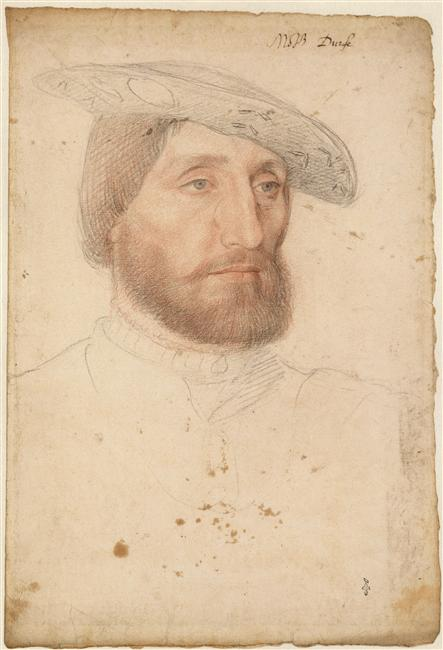
Claude d'Urfé by Jean Clouet, c. 1540.

Claude d'Urfé (1501, château de la Bastie d'Urfé-1558) was a French royal official of the 16th century. He acted as governor and bailiff of Forez after that county became a royal domain. He was a friend and confidant of Francis I and fought alongside him in the Wars of Italy as well as under his son Henry II. He was also governor of the dauphin (the future Francis II) and the king's other children (the future Charles IX, Henry III, Francis, Duke of Anjou and Margaret of Valois). He was also a major patron for building works in the Italian Renaissance style in Forez, such as his Italian-style extension to his château of Bastie d'Urfé. His grandson was the author Honoré d'Urfé.

== Life ==
=== Early life ===
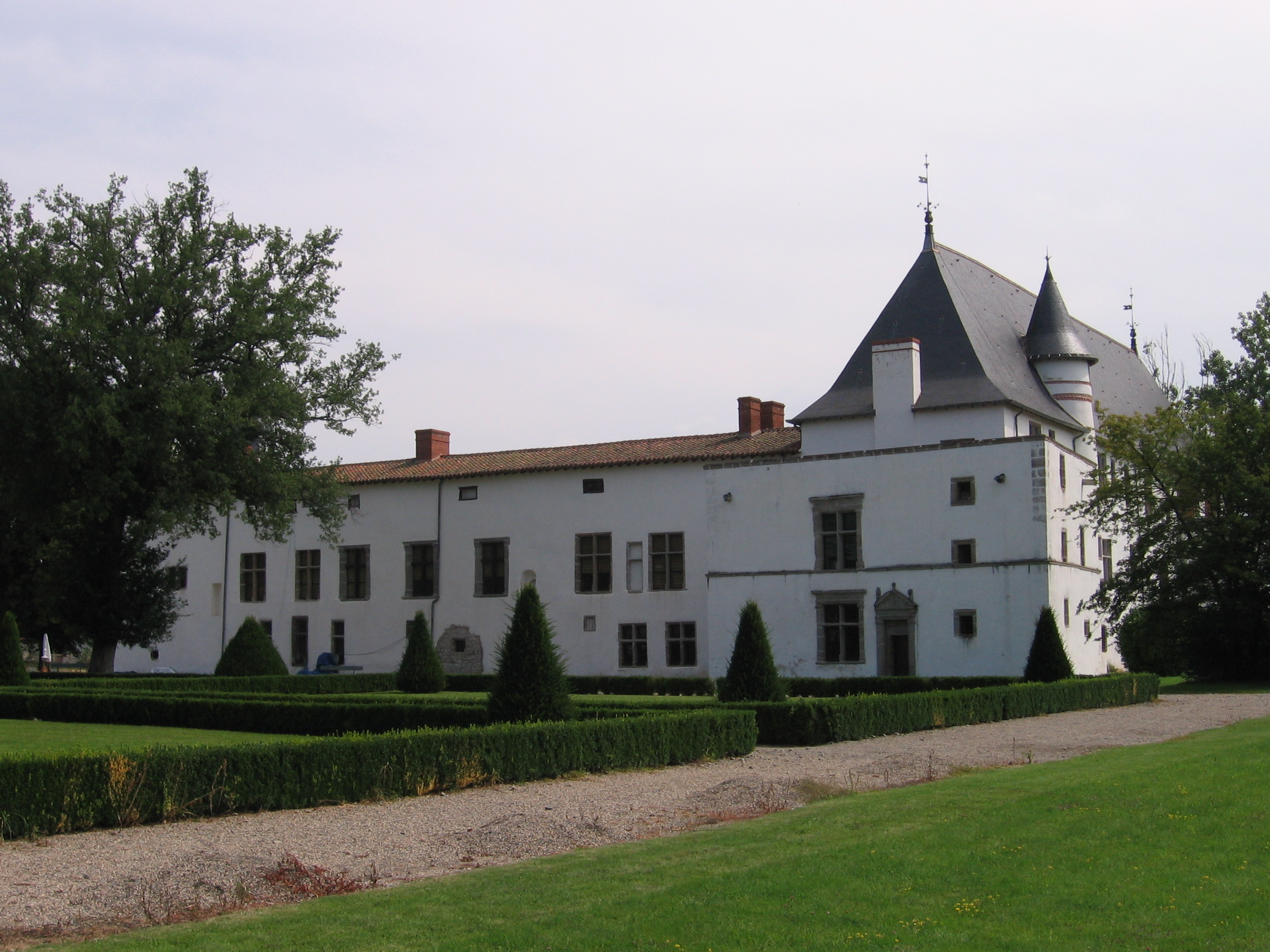
Bastie-d'Urfé Château

The heir to a lordly family from Saint-Étienne-le-Molard, Claude was the son of Pierre II d'Urfé and Antoinette de Beauvau. According to legend, his parents had had no child after five years of marriage and monks from the monastery Pierre had founded at Auvergne had prayed that he might have a son, who arrived a few months later, leading to his nickname as "the miracle child". Orphaned at a young age (his father died when he was seven), he was raised at the French court and became a confidant of Francis I, with whom he went to war in Italy aged twenty. The king made him a squire in ordinary in 1522. In 1535 Francis made him governor general and bailiff of the county of Forez, which had been forfeited for treason by Charles III of Bourbon. He was given this title at Montbrison, its capital, in 1536 when Francis came to symbolically take possession of the county.

=== Royal posts ===
He first became France's ambassador to the Holy Roman Empire before in 1546 being sent as France's representative to the Council of Trent. He remained in post after Francis I's death in 1547 and Francis' successor Henry II made him ambassador to the Papal States. Claude intervened early in the papal conclave after pope Paul III's death in 1549 after Reginald Pole came within two votes of election during the first vote. Claude rushed to the conclave door, demanding that it wait for the French cardinals, who he claimed were in Corsica, and threatening that the election of a pope in their absence would be likely to cause a schism. This helped push the conclave into a deadlock which lasted until February the following year.

Claude was then recalled to France by the king to become governor to the dauphin and his other children, succeeding Jean d'Humières in this post in 1550; he shared the responsibility with the governess of the royal children, Françoise d'Humières, under the orders of Diane de Poitiers.

As well as the king, he advised duke Anne de Montmorency, who was godfather to Claude's grandson Anne. In 1553 Claude joined the regency council of Catherine de Medici after Henry II's death. By his death in 1558 he was also a marshal of France.

=== Renaissance patron ===
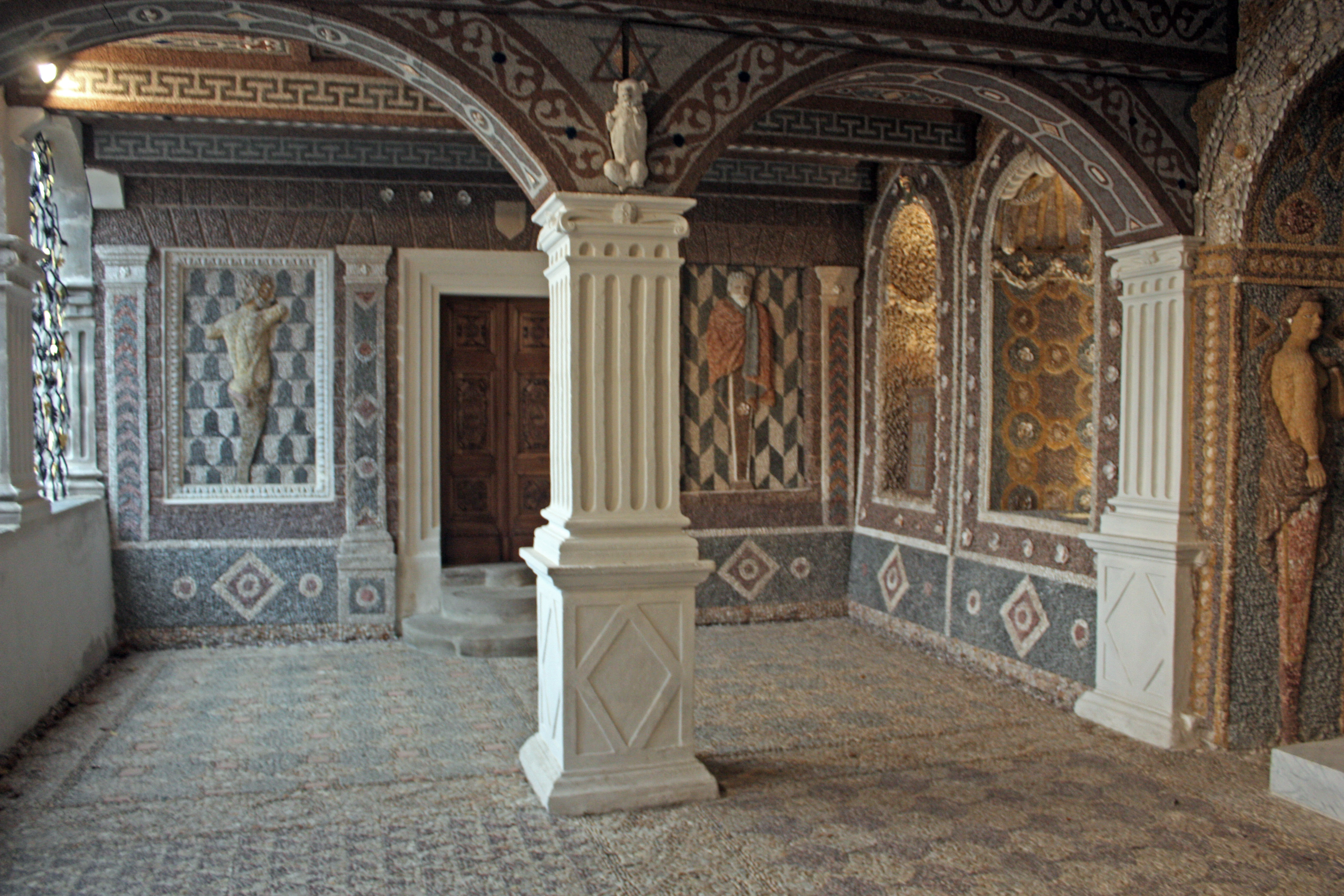
The 'salle des rocailles' in the château de La Bastie d'Urfé

Influenced by his friendship with Francis I (a major French Renaissance patron) and his time in Italy, Claude spread Renaissance art and design to Forez, most notably in his château and its chapel. His stepmother was a poet as well as a friend and confidant of Francis' sister Marguerite de Navarre, herself a poet, writer and patron of French humanists. He also interacted with court poets of the La Pléiade group such as Joachim du Bellay, who was one of the tutors Claude engaged whilst governor of the royal children. He also collected a large library which had reached 200 manuscripts and 4600 other volumes by the time of his death. His grandson, Honoré d'Urfé became a celebrated author in the 17th century, most known for his novel L'Astrée.
