= Château de la Bastie d'Urfé =

Château in Auvergne-Rhône-Alpes, France

Coordinates: 45.7274°N 4.0786°E

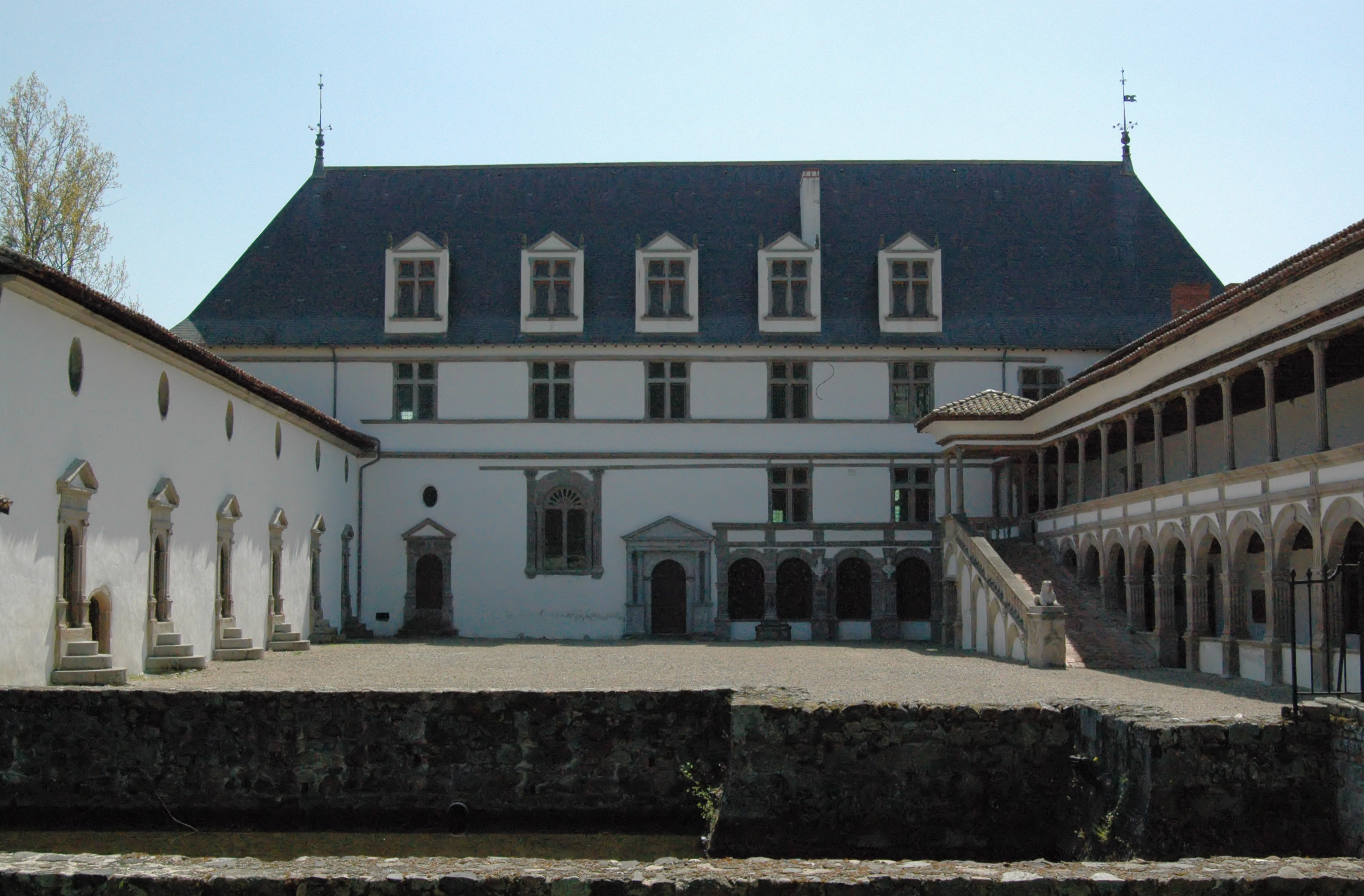
The Château de la Bastie d'Urfé

The Château de la Bastie d'Urfé (also known as Bastie d'Urfé or Bâtie d’Urfé) is a French château in the town of Saint-Étienne-le-Molard, historically within the province of Forez. In the 16th century it was rebuilt in the Renaissance style by Claude d'Urfé and bought in 1836 by Caroline de Lagrange (1806–1870), daughter of count Joseph Lagrange (1763–1836). The intarsia panelling of the 16th-century chapel is at the Metropolitan Museum of Art.
