= Pelmet =

Textile cover of the uppermost part of a window

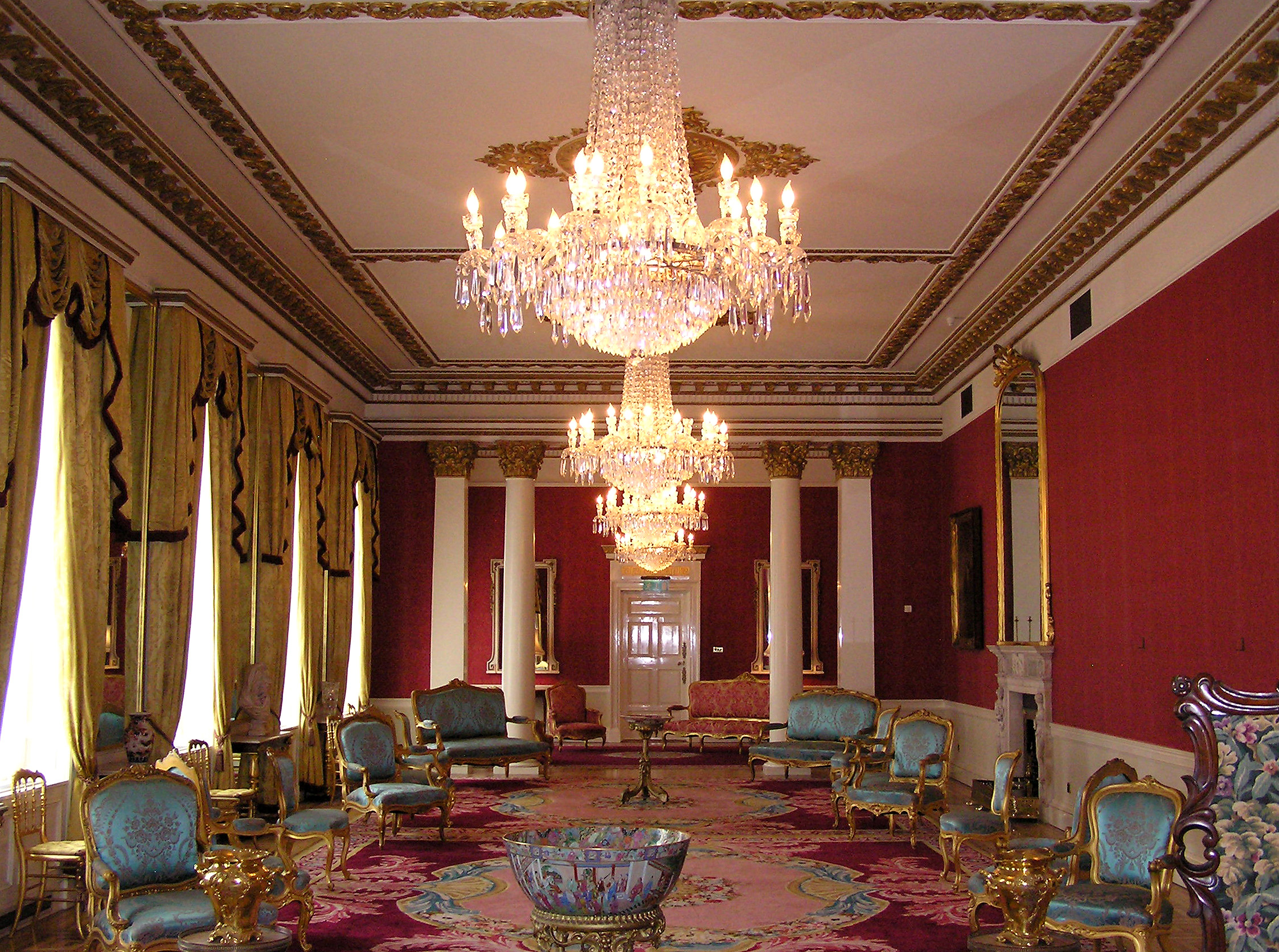
Formal interior with timber pelmets from which the curtains and swags are hung

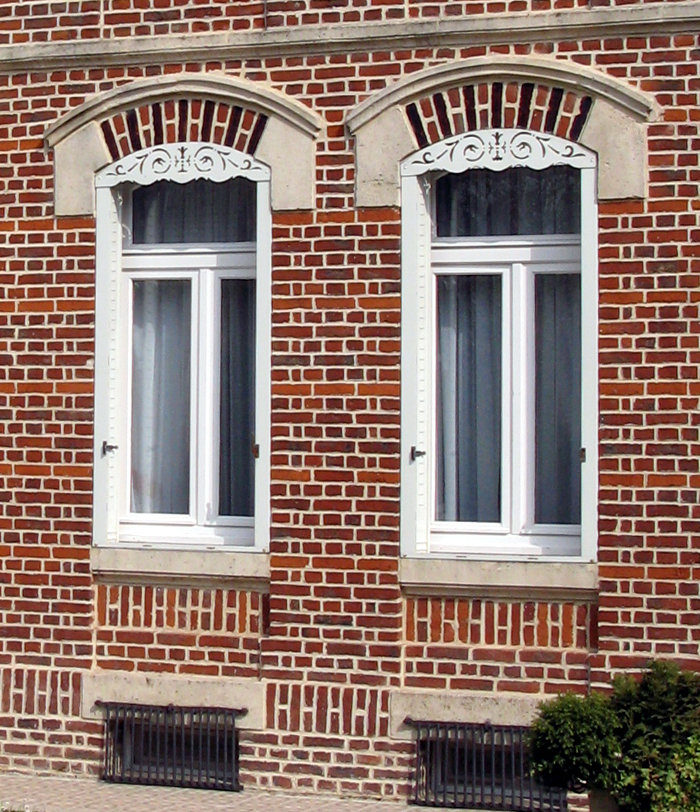
External decorative pelmets fitted within a brick and stone window opening

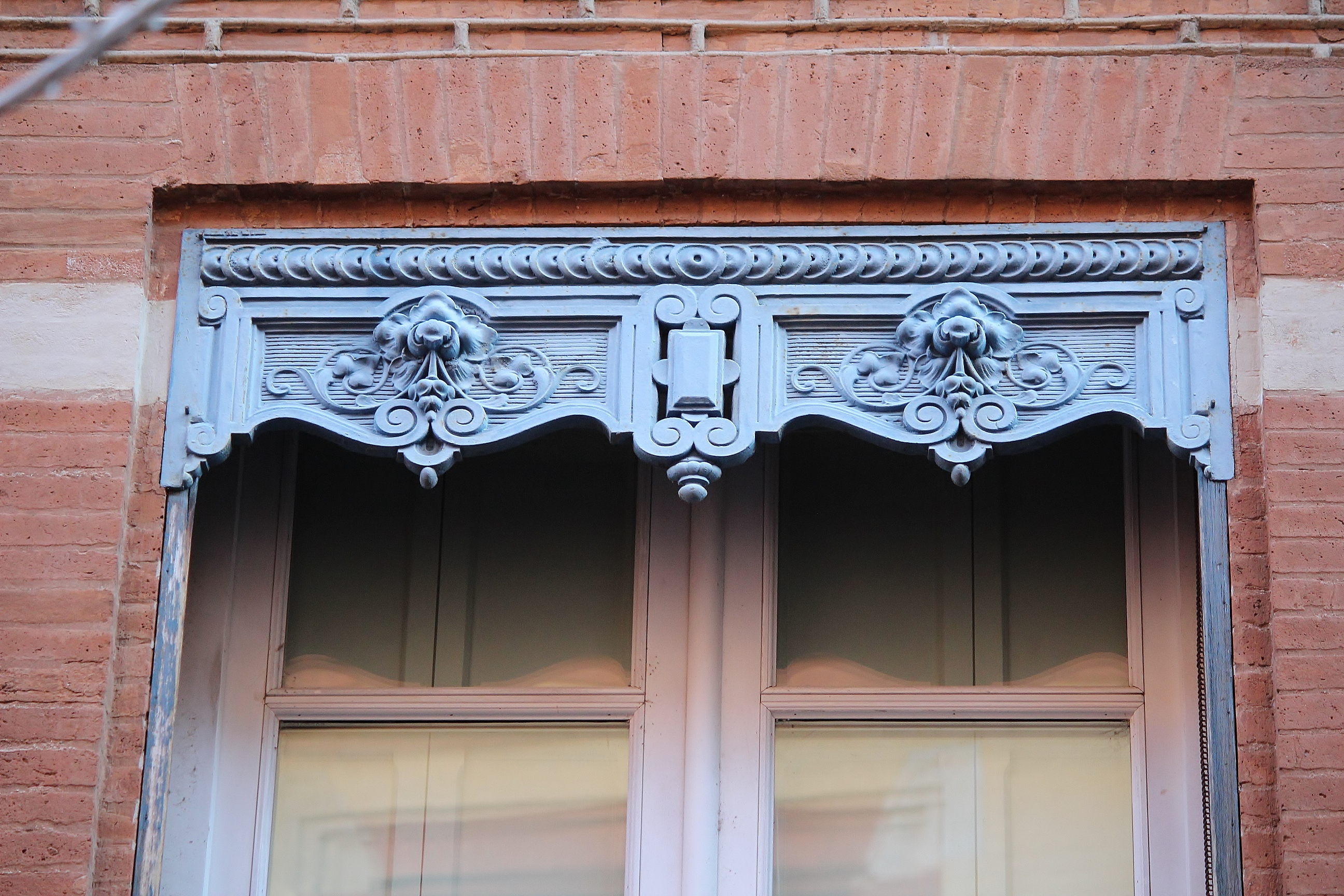
A pelmet in Toulouse

A pelmet (also called a "cornice board") is a framework placed above a window, used to conceal curtain fixtures. These can be used decoratively (to hide the curtain rod) and help insulate the window by preventing convection currents. It is similar in appearance to a valance, which performs the same function but is made of fabric. A pelmet can be made of plywood, and may be painted, or fabric covered.

In kitchen design, a "light pelmet" or "light rail" is placed under cabinets to hide lighting.

Exterior timber pelmets are a feature of some historic buildings, fitted on the outside of a window. These may be plain or decorative, with complex fretwork in some examples. These may be purely decorative, or serve to conceal an external blind mechanism.

Due to the appearance of a pelmet, the term is often used to describe an extremely short skirt.
