= Saint-Étienne-le-Molard =

- Commune
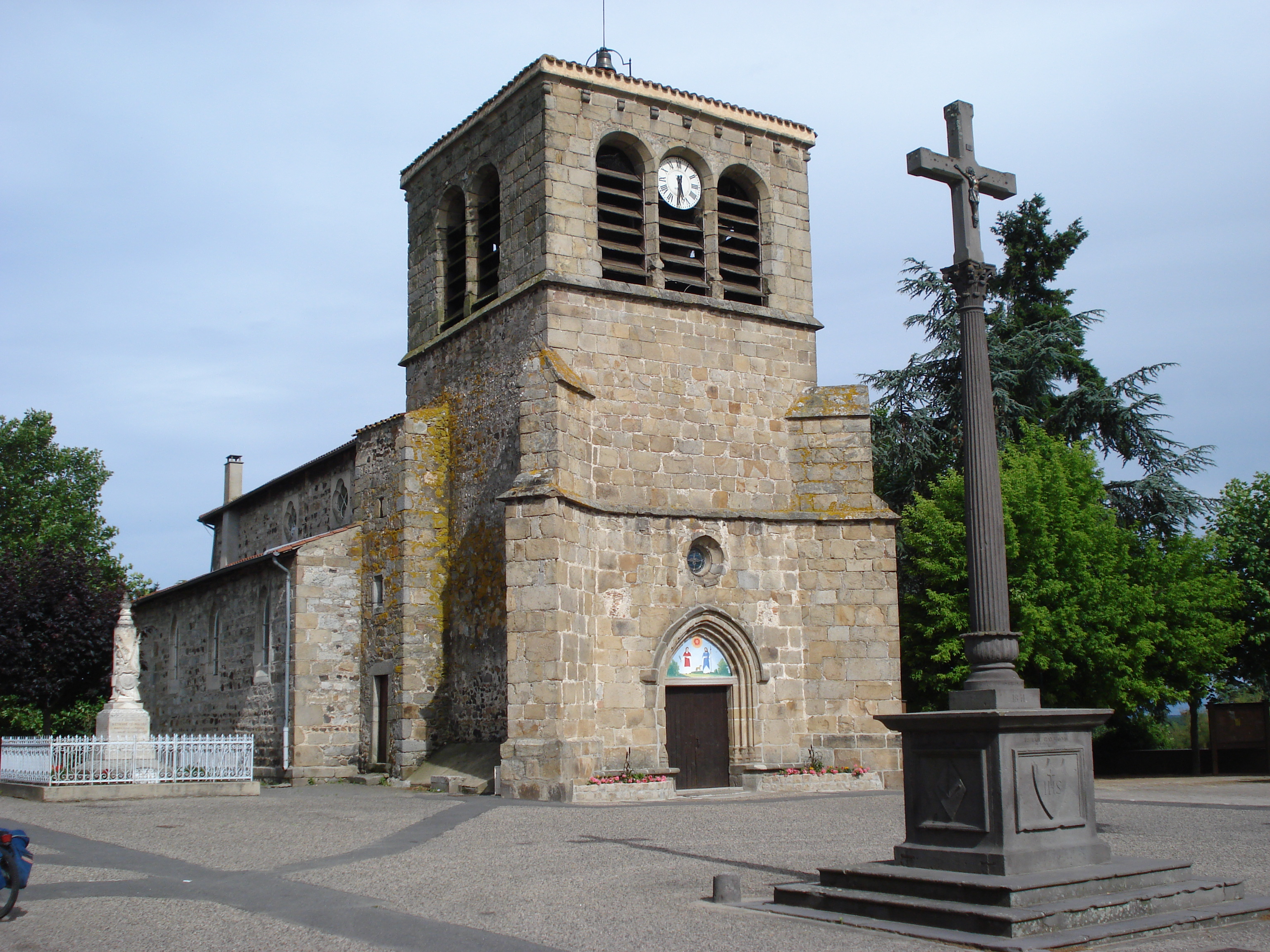
- Church and war memorial

- Coat of arms
- Location of Saint-Étienne-le-Molard
- Location within France Location within Auvergne-Rhône-Alpes
- Coordinates: 45°44′00″N 4°05′19″E
- Country: France
- Region: Auvergne-Rhône-Alpes
- Department: Loire
- Arrondissement: Montbrison
- Canton: Boën-sur-Lignon
- Intercommunality: CA Loire Forez

Government
  - Mayor (2020–2026): Michelle Jourjon
- Area^{1}: 16.55 km^{2} (6.39 sq mi)
- Elevation: 380 m (1,250 ft)
- Highest elevation: 397 m (1,302 ft)
- Lowest elevation: 338 m (1,109 ft)
- Population (2023): 1,033
  - Density: 62.42/km^{2} (161.7/sq mi)
- Time zone: UTC+01:00 (CET)
  - Summer (DST): UTC+02:00 (CEST)
- INSEE/Postal code: 42219 /42130
- ^{1} French Land Register data, which excludes lakes, ponds, glaciers > 1 km^{2} (0.386 sq mi or 247 acres) and river estuaries.

Saint-Étienne-le-Molard (French pronunciation: [sɛ̃.t‿etjɛn lə mɔlaʁ]; Arpitan: Sant-Ètièven-lo-Molâr) is a commune in the Loire department in central France.

== Geography ==
The river Lignon du Forez flows through the commune.

== Population ==
Historical population
Year	Pop.	±% p.a.
1968	620	—
1975	659	+0.88%
1982	630	−0.64%
1990	625	−0.10%
1999	751	+2.06%
2007	885	+2.07%
2012	984	+2.14%
2017	1,019	+0.70%
2023	1,033	+0.23%
Source: INSEE

== See also ==
- Communes of the Loire department
