= Nast =

Nast may refer to:

== People ==
- Charlotte Georgia Nast (1905–1991), American botanist
- Condé Montrose Nast (1873–1942), American journalist and entrepreneur
  - Condé Nast, the publication company founded by C. M. Nast
- Jean Népomucène Hermann Nast (1754–1817), Austrian artist and entrepreneur
- Thomas Nast, (1840–1902) German-born American caricaturist and editorial cartoonist
- William Nast (Methodist) (1807–1899), American religious leader
- William F. Nast (1840–1893), American business manager

== Organizations ==
- Manufacture de Nast, a porcelain factory founded by Jean Népomucène Hermann Nast
- See also organizations with acronym NAST (disambiguation)
