= French porcelain =

Porcelain production in France

French porcelain has a history spanning a period from the 17th century to the present. The French were heavily involved in the early European efforts to discover the secrets of making the hard-paste porcelain known from Chinese and Japanese export porcelain. They succeeded in developing soft-paste porcelain, but Meissen porcelain was the first to make true hard-paste, around 1710, and the French took over 50 years to catch up with Meissen and the other German factories.

But by the 1760s, kaolin had been discovered near Limoges, and the relocated royal-owned Sèvres factory took the lead in European porcelain design as rococo turned into what is broadly known as the Louis XVI style and then the Empire style. French styles were soon being imitated in porcelain in Germany, England, and as far afield as Russia. They were also imitated in the cheaper French faience, and this and other materials elsewhere. This dominance lasted until at least 1830.

Before the French Revolution in 1789, French production was complicated by various royal patents and monopolies restricting the production of various types of wares, which could sometimes be circumvented by obtaining the "protection" of a member of the royal family or senior courtier; this might or might not involve ownership by them.

Throughout the 18th and 19th centuries, France had a vigorous faience industry, making high-quality tin-glazed earthenware that remained in touch with artistic fashion. At least before 1800, this catered to the lower end of the market very successfully, so that porcelain factories concentrated on the top end, in France and elsewhere. Compared to other European countries, French manufacturers have generally concentrated on tablewares and decorative vessels rather than figures, with Mennecy-Villeroy porcelain being something of an exception. Where figures and groups were produced, these were most often in the French invention of unglazed biscuit porcelain.

== Soft-paste blue-and-white porcelain ==
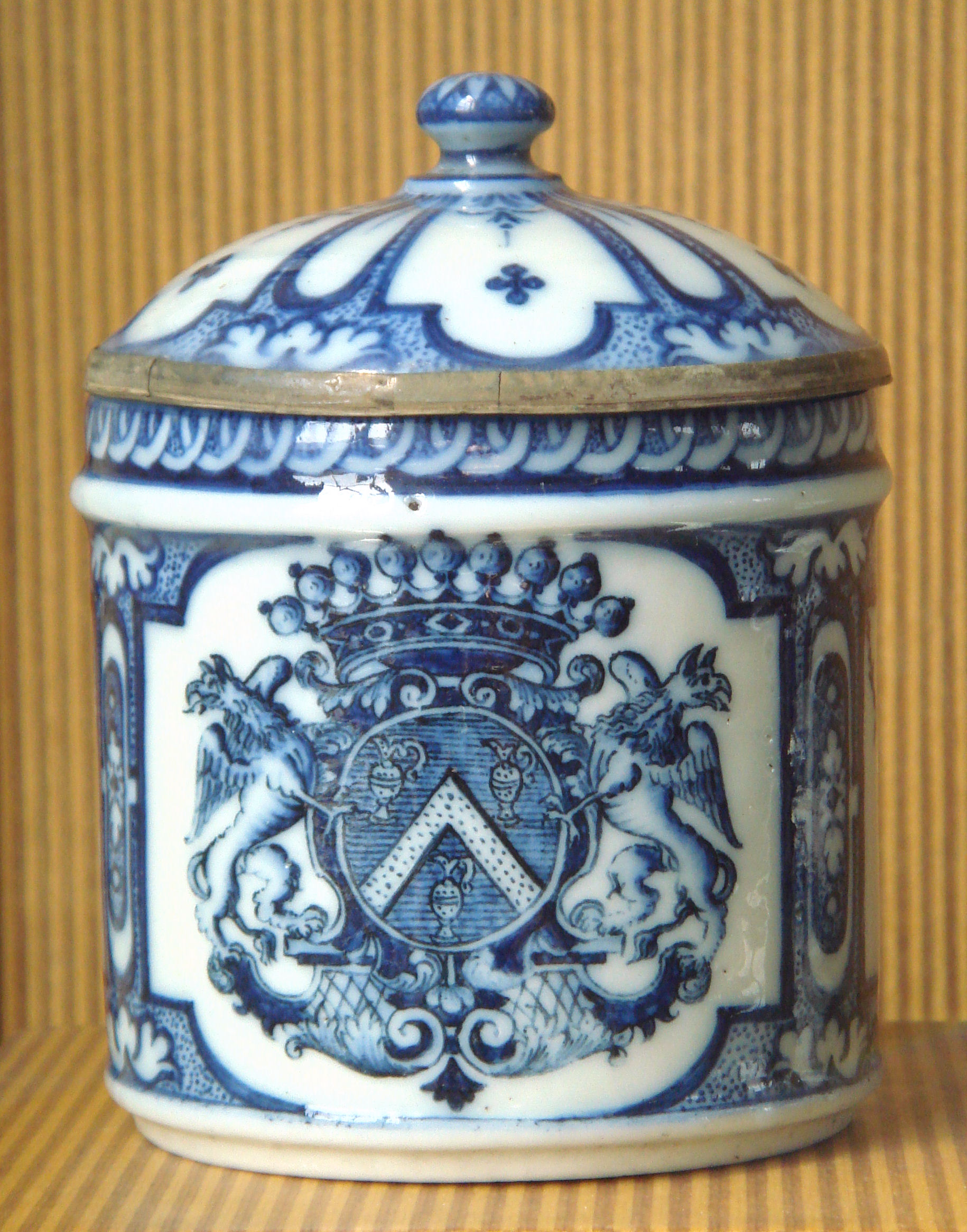
Rouen soft-paste porcelain, the first French porcelain, end of the 17th century

Chinese porcelain had long been imported from China, and was a very expensive and desired luxury. Chinese porcelains were treasured, collected from the time of Francis I, and sometimes adorned with elaborate mountings of precious metal to protect them and enhance their beauty. Huge amounts especially of silver were sent from Europe to China to pay for the desired Chinese porcelain wares, and numerous attempts were made to duplicate the material.

It was in Nevers faience that Chinese-style blue and white wares were produced for the first time in France, with production running between 1650 and 1680. Chinese styles would then be taken up by factories in Normandy, especially following the foundation of the French East India Company in 1664.

The first soft-paste porcelain in France was developed in an effort to imitate high-valued Chinese hard-paste porcelain, and follow the attempts of Medici porcelain in the 16th century. The first soft-paste frit porcelain, was produced at the Rouen manufactory in 1673, in order to mimic "la véritable porcelaine de Chine" ("The true porcelain of China"), and became known as "Porcelaine française". The technique of producing the new material was discovered by the Rouen potter Louis Poterat; his licence to make "faience and porcelain" was taken out in 1673, signed by the king and Jean-Baptiste Colbert The soft porcelain used blue designs of the type already used in the faiences of the period. Dr. Martin Lister reported from his voyage to Paris, printed in 1698, that a manufacture of porcelain "as white and translucid as the one that came from the East" was in full operation at Saint-Cloud.

The French lexicographer Jacques Savary des Brûlons wrote in 1722 about these first experiments in his Dictionnaire universel du commerce:

Fifteen or twenty years ago an attempt was made in France to copy Chinese porcelain: the first attempts made in Rouen were quite successful, ... these faience objects from new factories are not ranked as French faience – this is the genuine porcelain invented by the French during the last few years and manufactured successively in Rouen, Passy near Paris, and then in Saint Cloud.

Colbert set up the Royal Factory of Saint-Cloud in 1664 in order to make copies (In the original "Contre-façons", i.e. "Fakes") of "Indian-style" porcelain. Saint-Cloud became a very important manufactory for the new wares.

However, once French manufacturers discovered how to produce a much wider range of colours in porcelain by the 1730s, using overglaze "enamel" decoration, they abandoned underglaze blue more quickly and thoroughly than those of other European countries - some English factories continued to make a significant proportion of blue and white wares until the end of the century and beyond.

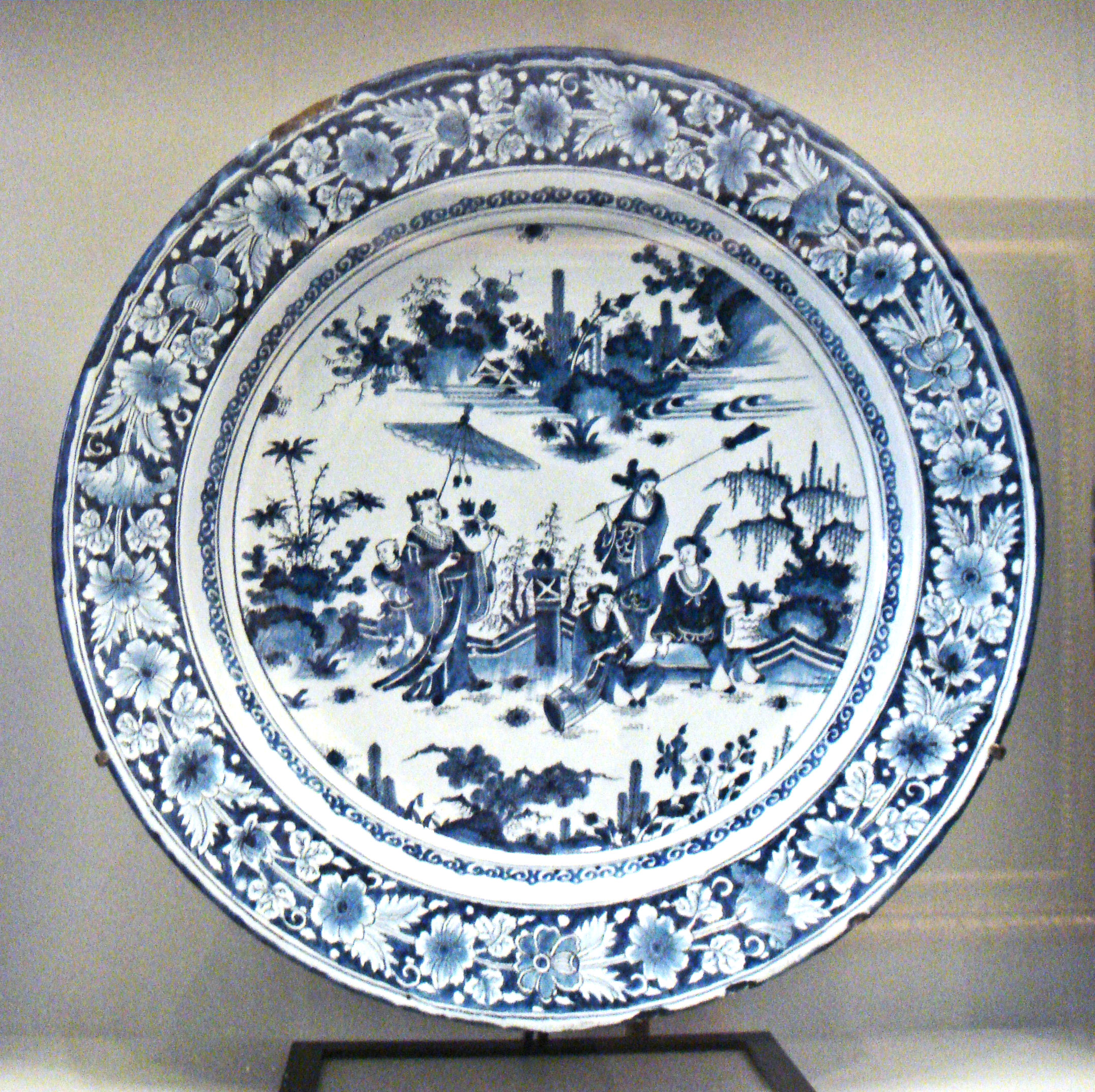
Faience (not porcelain) with Chinese scenes, Nevers manufactory, 1680–1700.

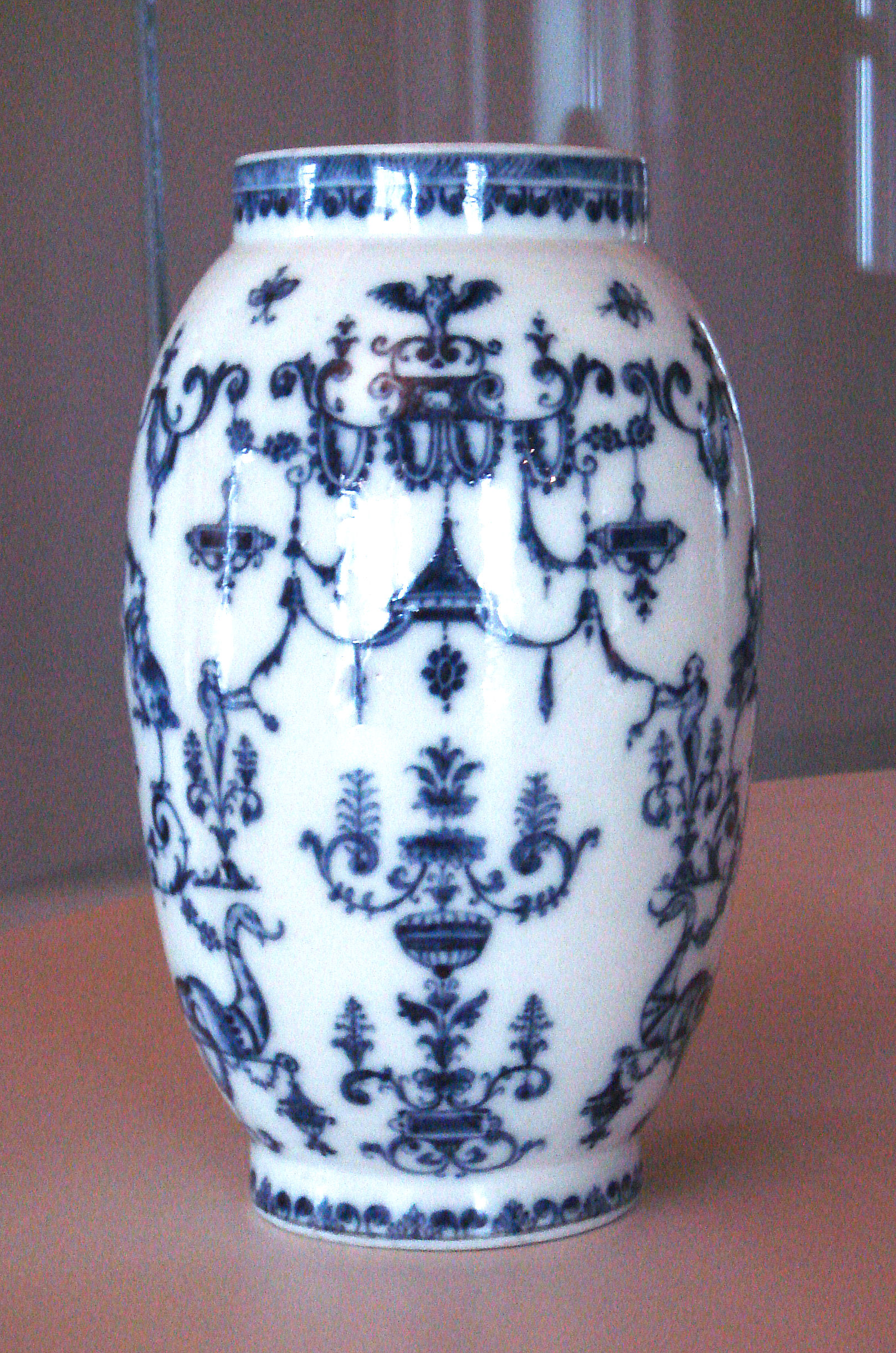
Saint-Cloud manufactory soft-paste porcelain vase, with blue designs under glaze, 1695–1700

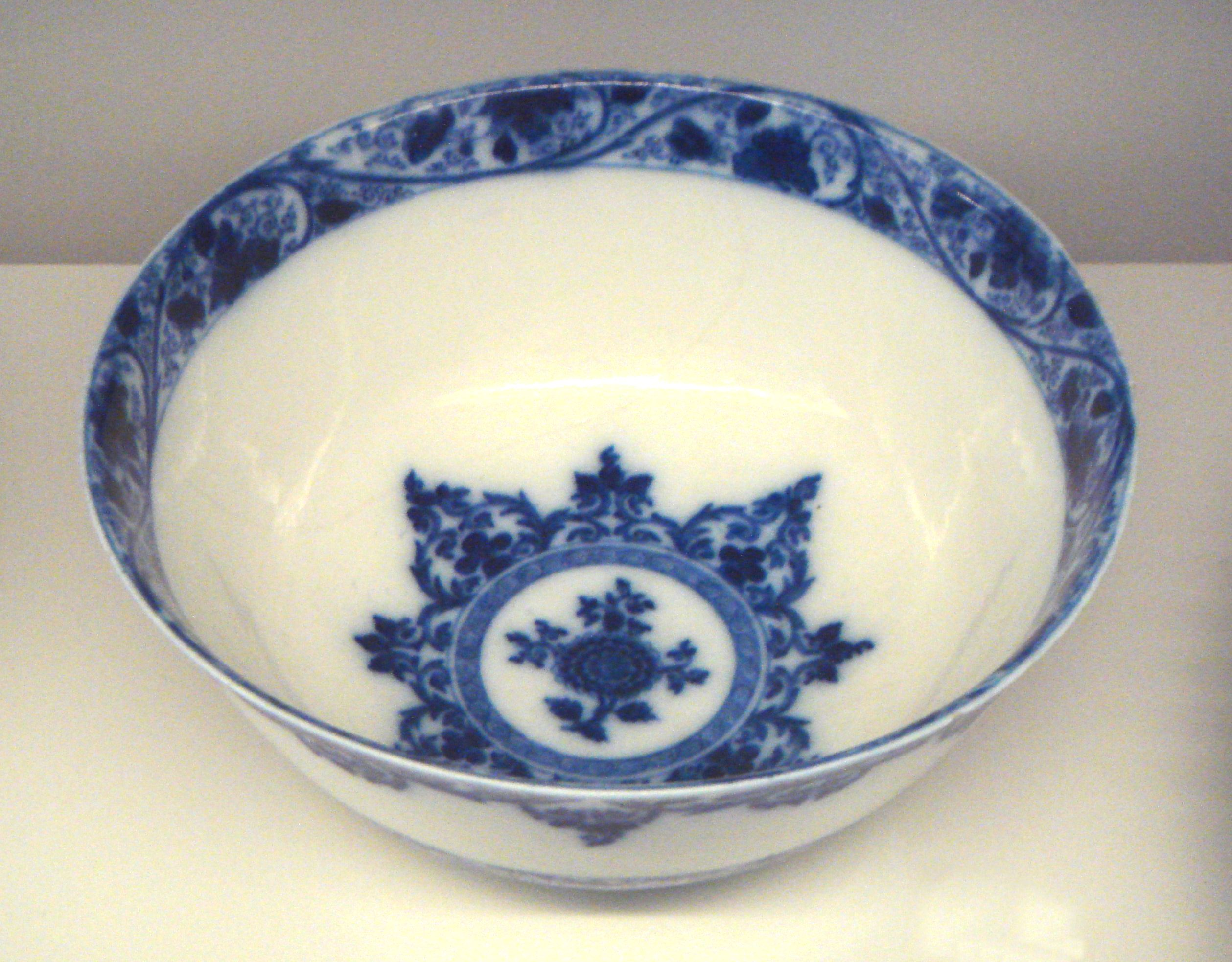
Saint-Cloud manufactory, 1700–1710

== Asian polychrome designs ==
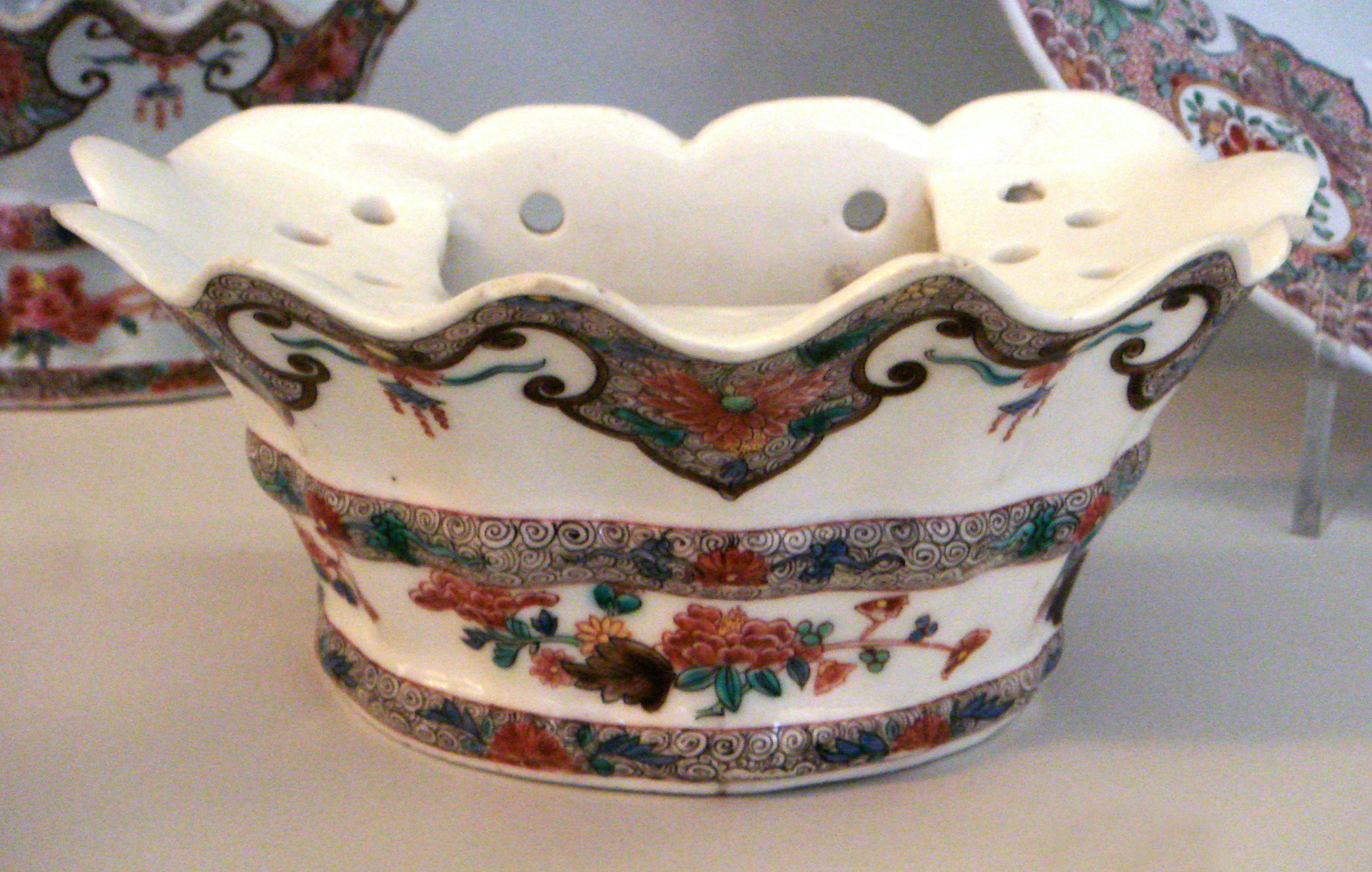
Saint-Cloud soft-paste porcelain flower holder, in Chinese "Famille Rose" style, 1730–1740

Louis XIV had received 1,500 pieces of porcelain from the Siamese Embassy to France in 1686, but the manufacturing secret had remained elusive.

France finally discovered the Chinese technique of hard-paste porcelain through the efforts of the Jesuit Father François Xavier d'Entrecolles between 1712 and 1722. The letters sent to Father Orry in Paris were first published by Jean-Baptiste Du Halde in 1735, with English editions appearing in 1736 or 1738. The letters were later again published by Abbé Jean-Baptiste Grosier in his General Description of China. D'Entrecolles also sent material specimens to Europe, which were analysed by Réaumur, and led to the establishment of the Sèvres Manufactory once equivalent materials were found in Europe.

After 1730, polychrome porcelain also came to be produced, often in imitation of Chinese polychrome styles of porcelain, such as the "Famille rose" types. The Japanese Kakiemon style of Arita porcelain, Japan, known as "Fleurs indiennes" ("Flowers of the Indies") was also used as an inspiration, especially in Saint-Cloud porcelain and Chantilly porcelain. A patent granted to the Chantilly factory in 1735 by Louis XV specifically describes the right to make porcelain façon de Japon ("in imitation of the porcelain of Japan").

Meanwhile, the manufacturing technique of soft-paste porcelain seems to have been transmitted to England by French Huguenot refugees. The first soft-paste in England was demonstrated by Thomas Briand to the Royal Society in 1742 and is believed to have been based on the Saint-Cloud formula.

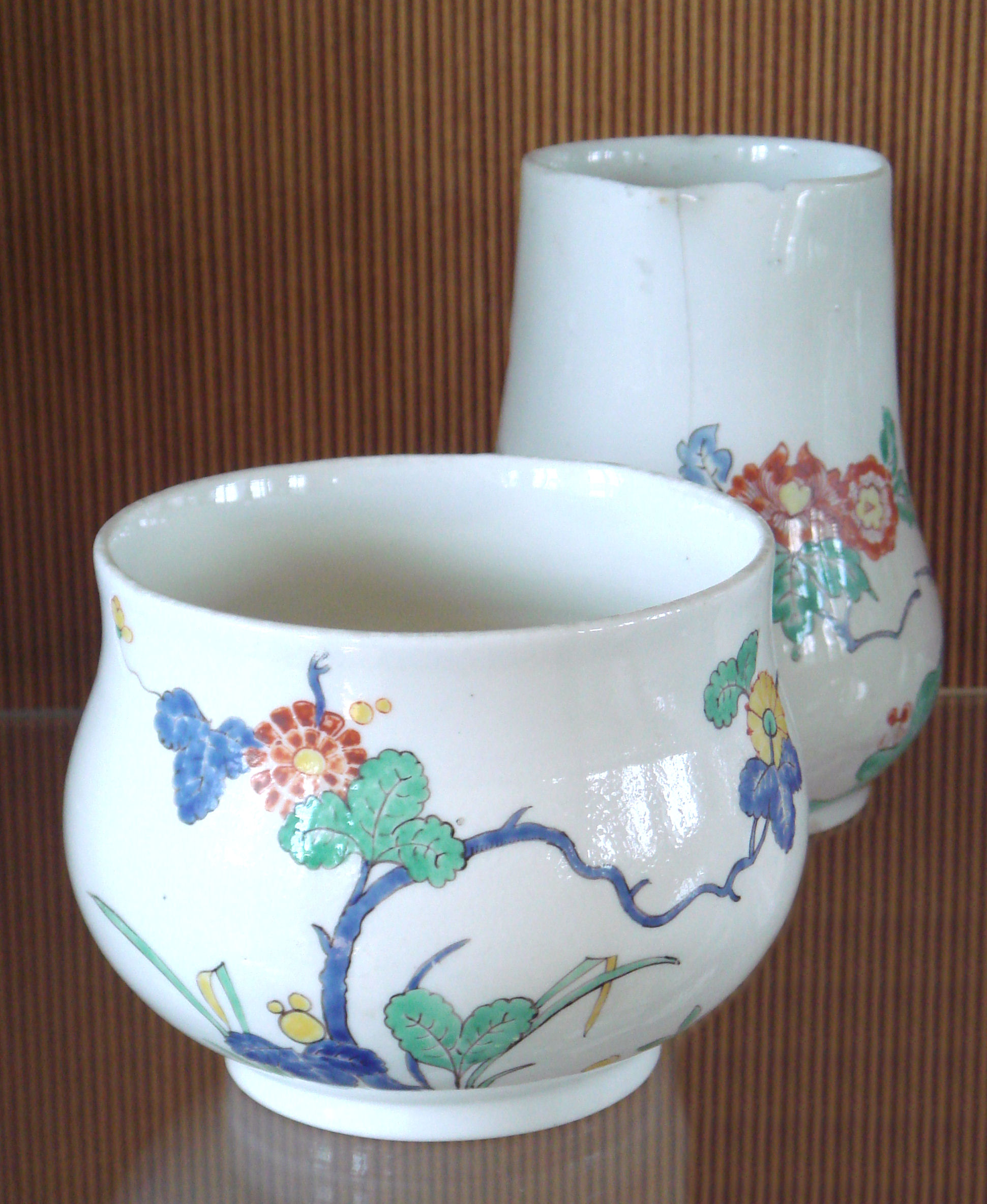
Chantilly porcelain sugar bowl, Japanese Kakiemon style, made under Ciquaire Cirou, 1725–1751

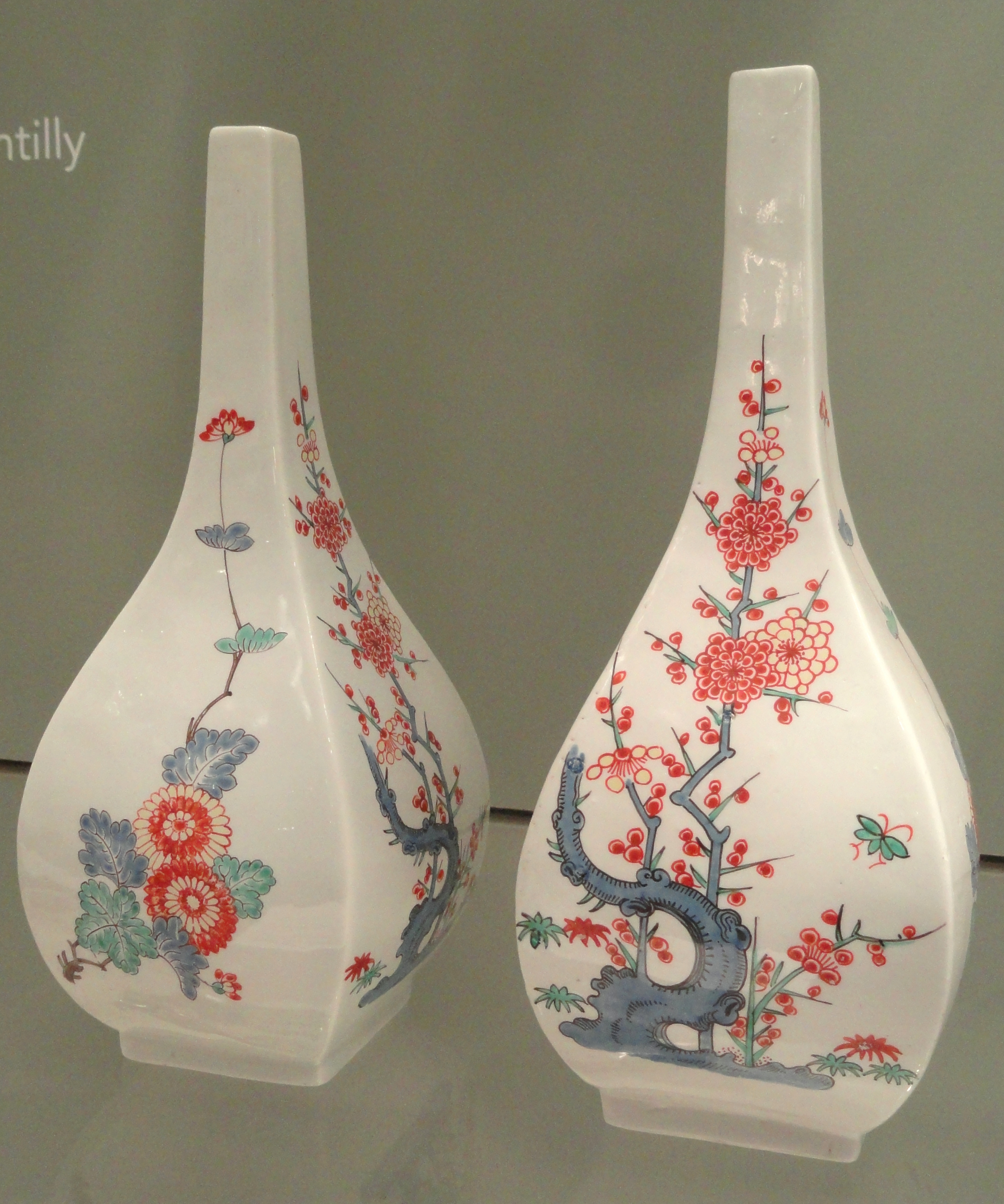
Pair of square flasks, c. 1730–1740, Chantilly

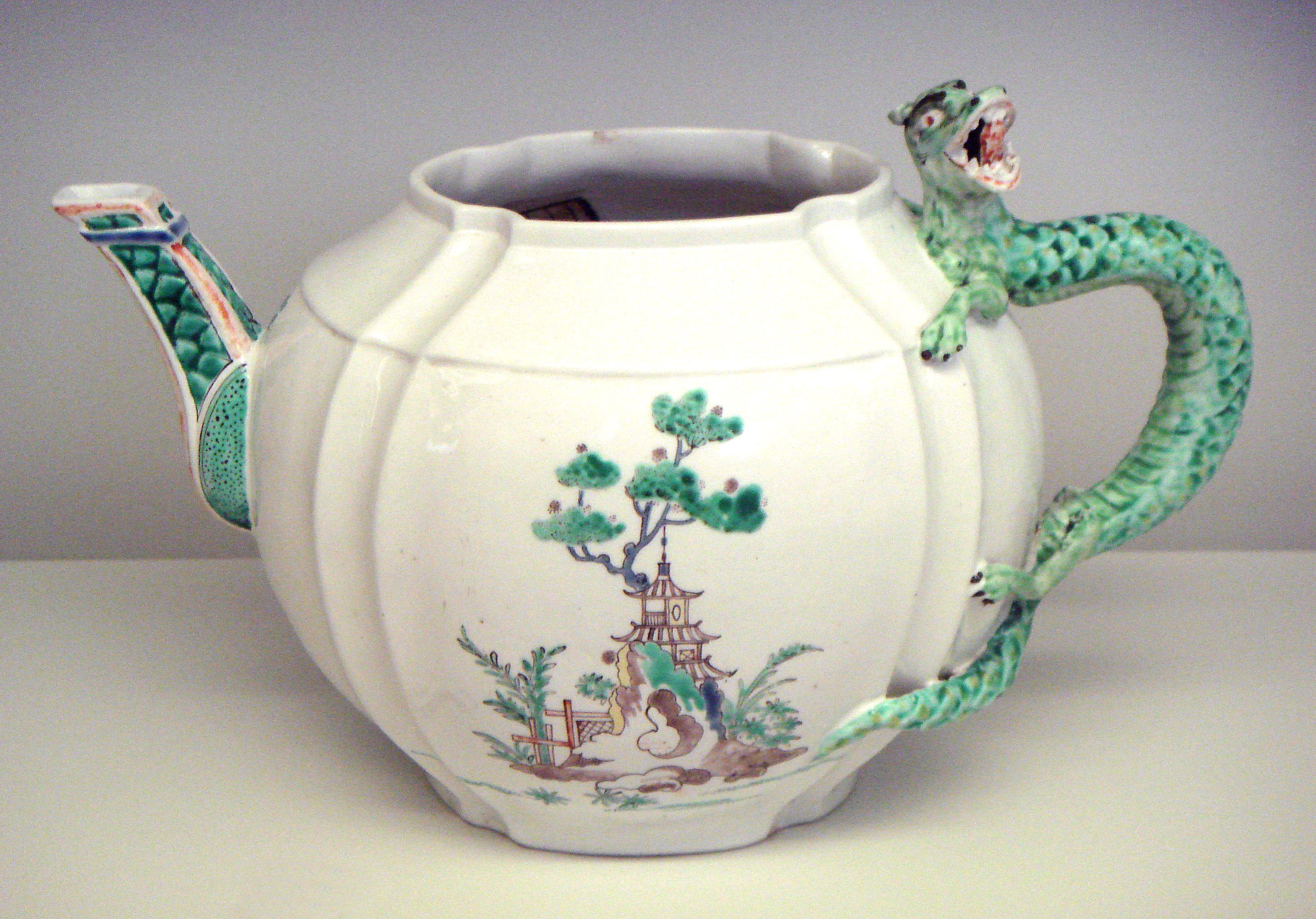
Chantilly soft-paste porcelain teapot with Chinese design, 1735–1740

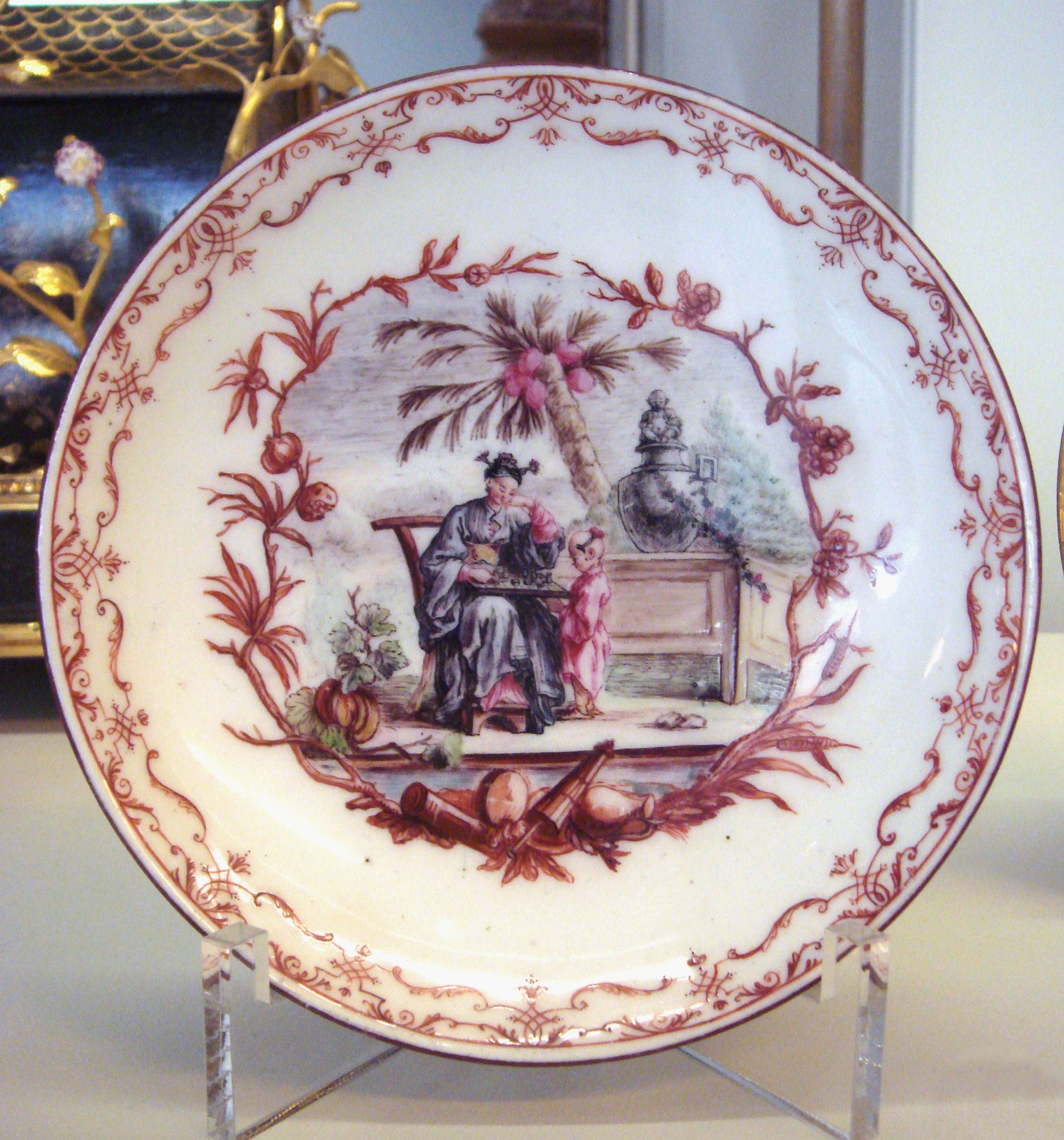
Vincennes plate, 1749–53; a Chinese subject treated in a Western style

== Development of original French designs ==
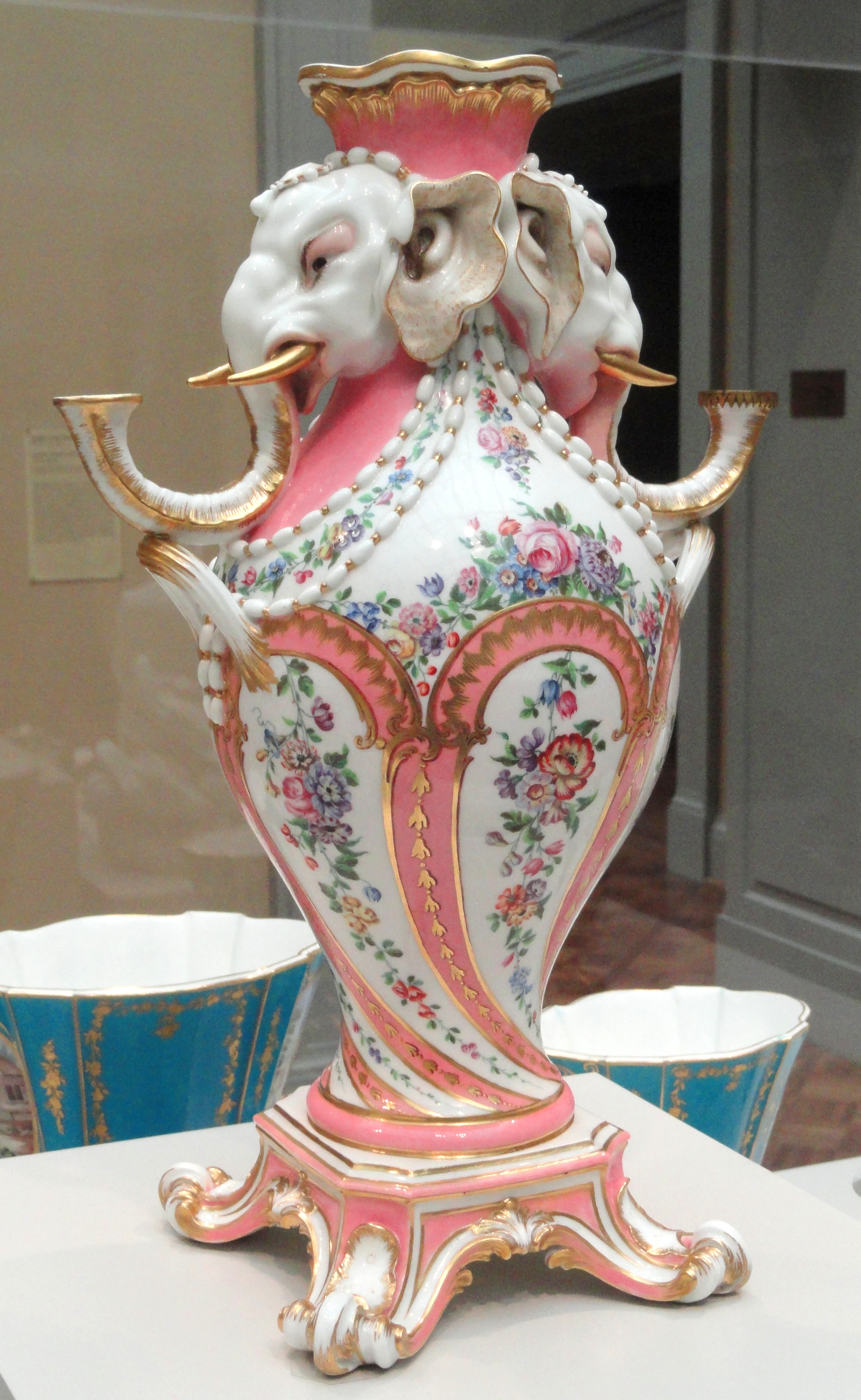
Elephant-head vase, 1757–1758, one of Sèvres's most exuberant designs, made in pairs

After this initial period, up to the end of the 18th century, French porcelain manufactories would progressively abandon their Chinese and Japanese designs, to become more French in character. Vincennes soft-paste porcelain started to display original French inspiration towards its last years of operation, after which the abundant, varied, and original productions of Sèvres porcelain continued the trend. Biscuit porcelain was first used at Vincennes in 1751 by the director Jean-Jacques Bachelier; this simply involved not glazing or painting the piece after a single firing, leaving a matt surface resembling marble. But the pieces had to be perfect, as there was no glaze to cover up faults, so in practice the wastage made them more expensive to produce. Brilliant new colours were developed at Vincennes and Sèvres in the 1750s and 1760s, especially a blue and a rose. These were often shown off as the ground colour of the body, with painted decoration within compartments left with a white ground.

In 1756 the Vincennes factory was moved to Sèvres, where it still remains in production, and in 1759 it was bought by the king, although his mistress Madame de Pompadour was allowed effective free rein to oversee it. A period of superb quality in both design and production followed, creating much of the enduring reputation of French porcelain. The light-hearted Rococo was given a more serious air, often by restricting it to the painting, rather than the porcelain shape.

Porcelain production further developed with Limoges porcelain, a type of hard-paste porcelain produced by factories near the city of Limoges, France. The manufacturing of hard-paste porcelain in Limoges was established in 1771 following the discovery of local supplies of kaolin and a material similar to petuntse in the economically distressed area at Saint-Yrieix-la-Perche, near Limoges. In parallel, soft-paste porcelain continued to be manufactured however, as it was less expensive to produce.

Nast porcelain (1783–1835) and Dihl and Guérhard (1781–1828) were two of a number of factories making very high-quality porcelain in Paris in the decades around 1800. This contrasted with London, where the factories had all closed or removed north by 1775, although the capital remained, like Paris, a centre for decorating plain "blanks" made elsewhere – in France often in Limoges porcelain. Dagoty and Honoré and Darte were other Paris factories. By 1830 most factories had closed or moved to Limoges.

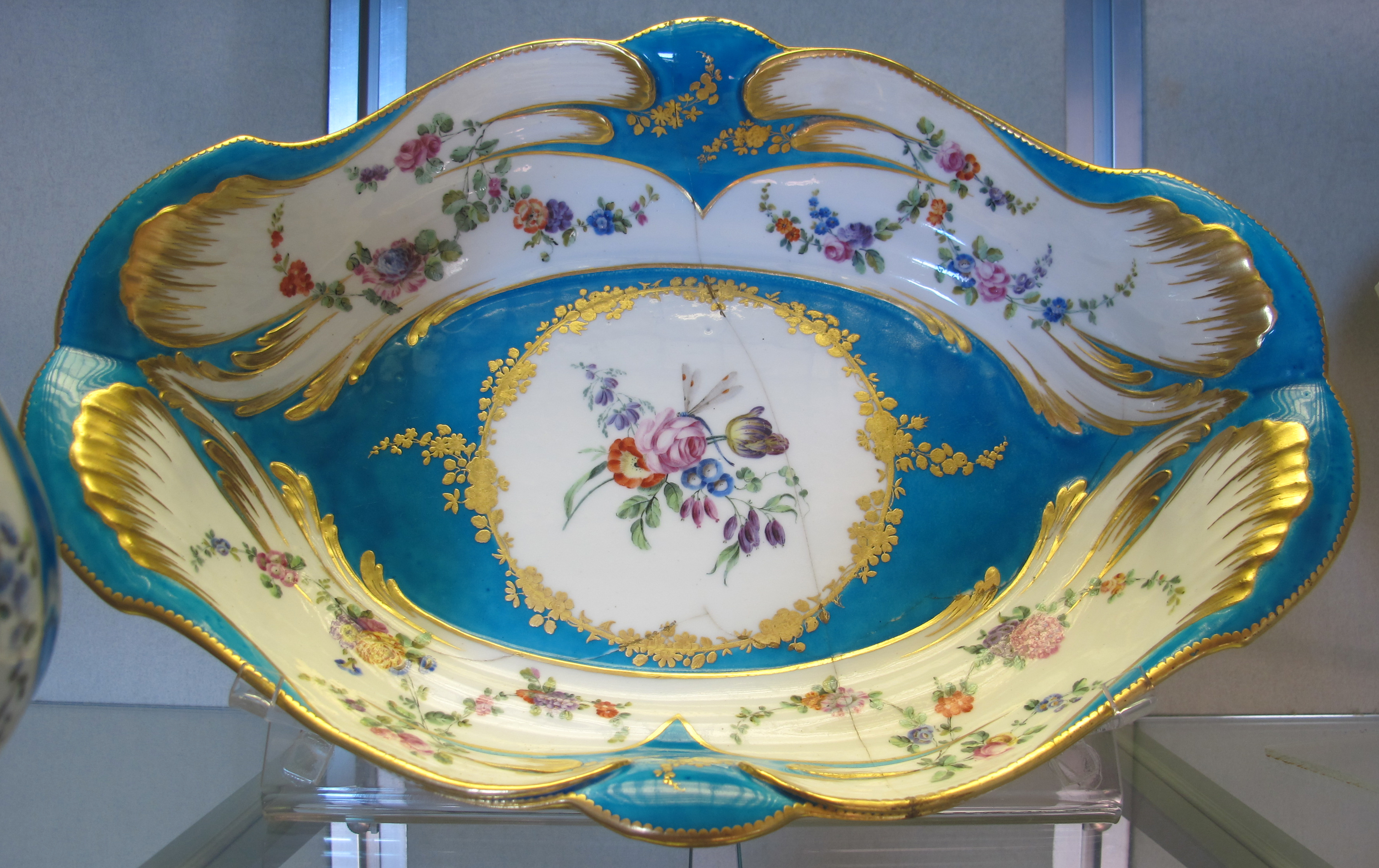
Vincennes dish, 1750–56

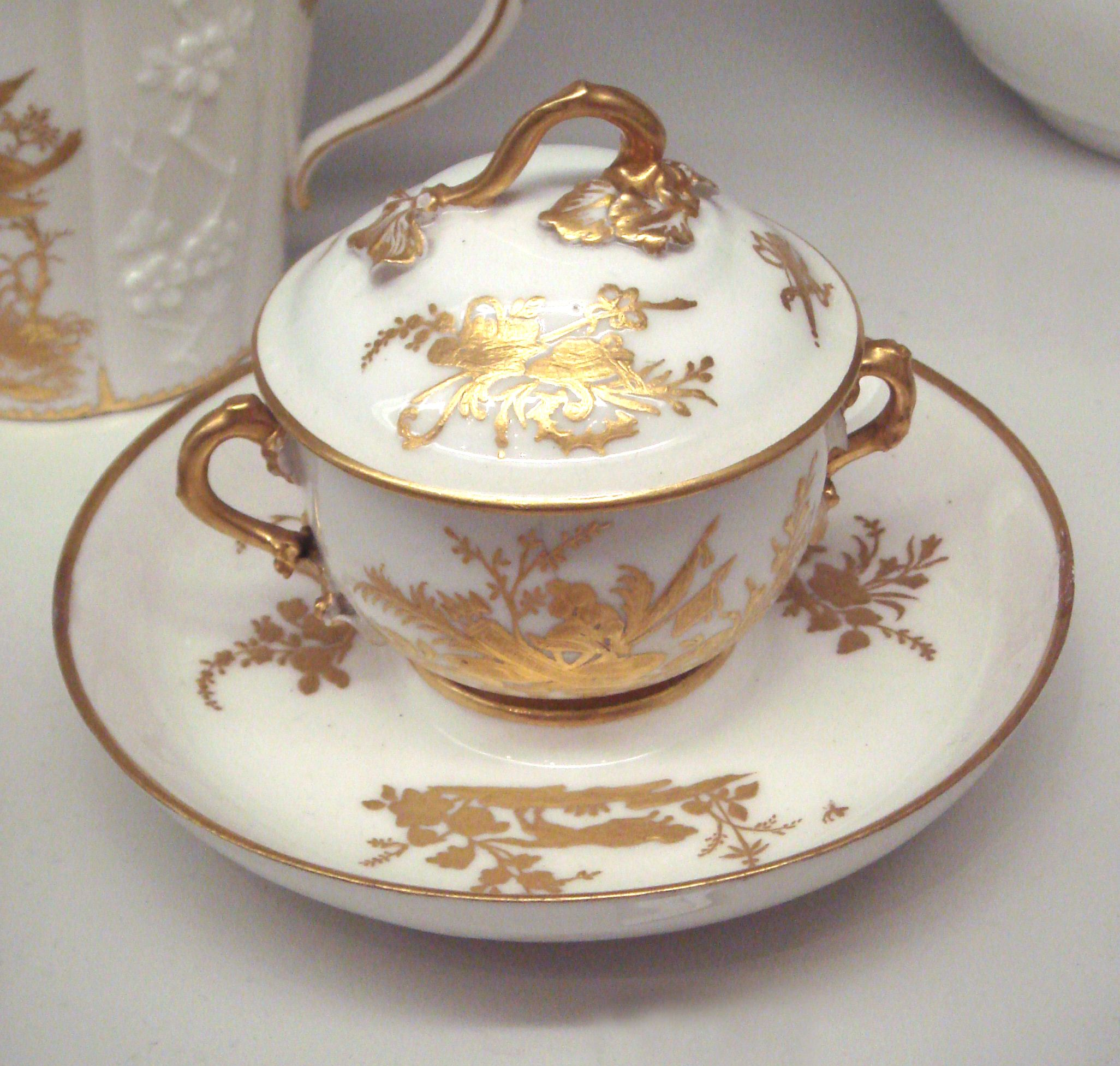
Vincennes soft-porcelain cup, 1750–1752

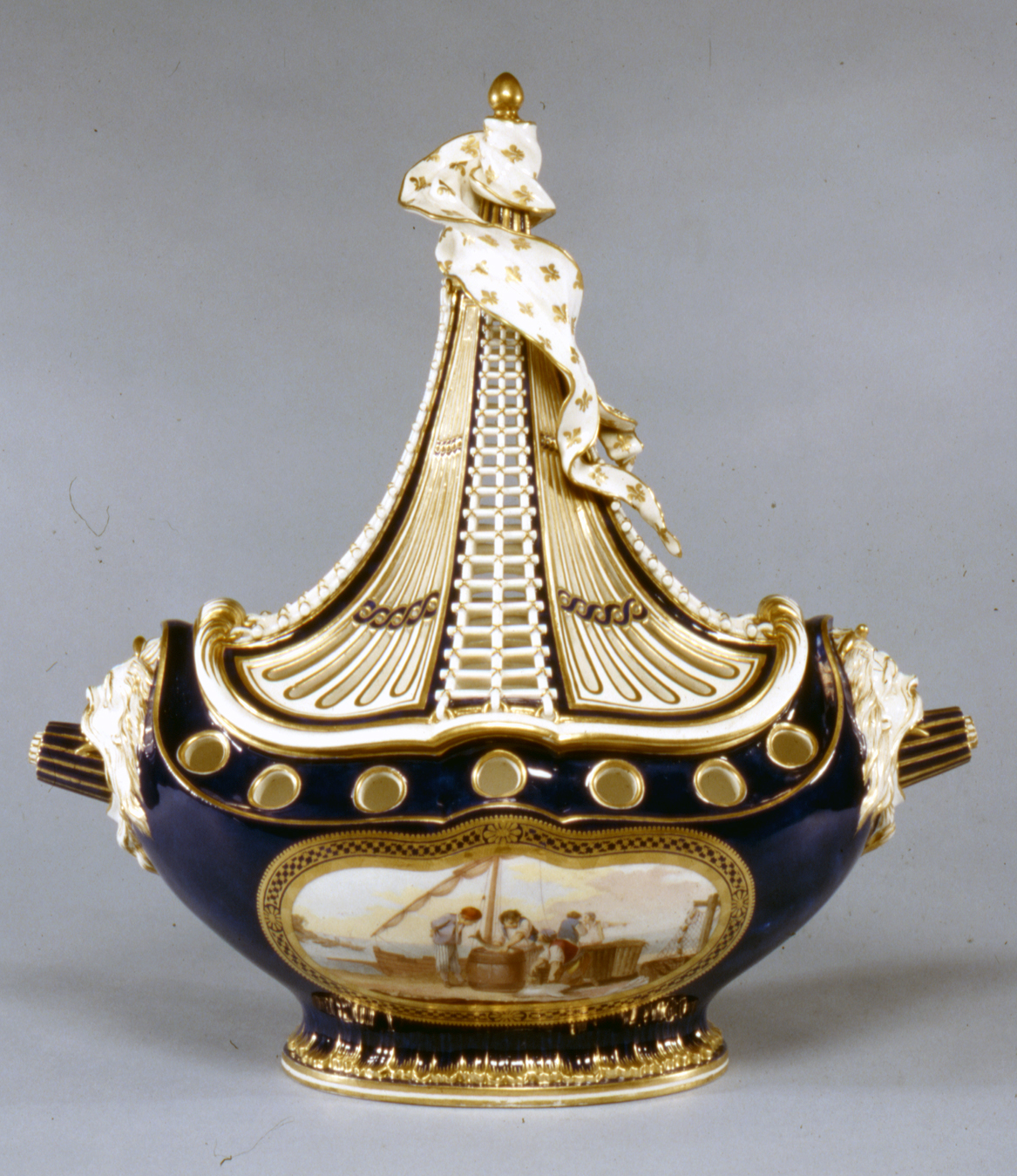
Sèvres pot-pourri vase in the shape of a ship, 1763, porcelain

Sèvres Manufactory sucrier and cover – pot à sucre Bouret shape – circa 1770

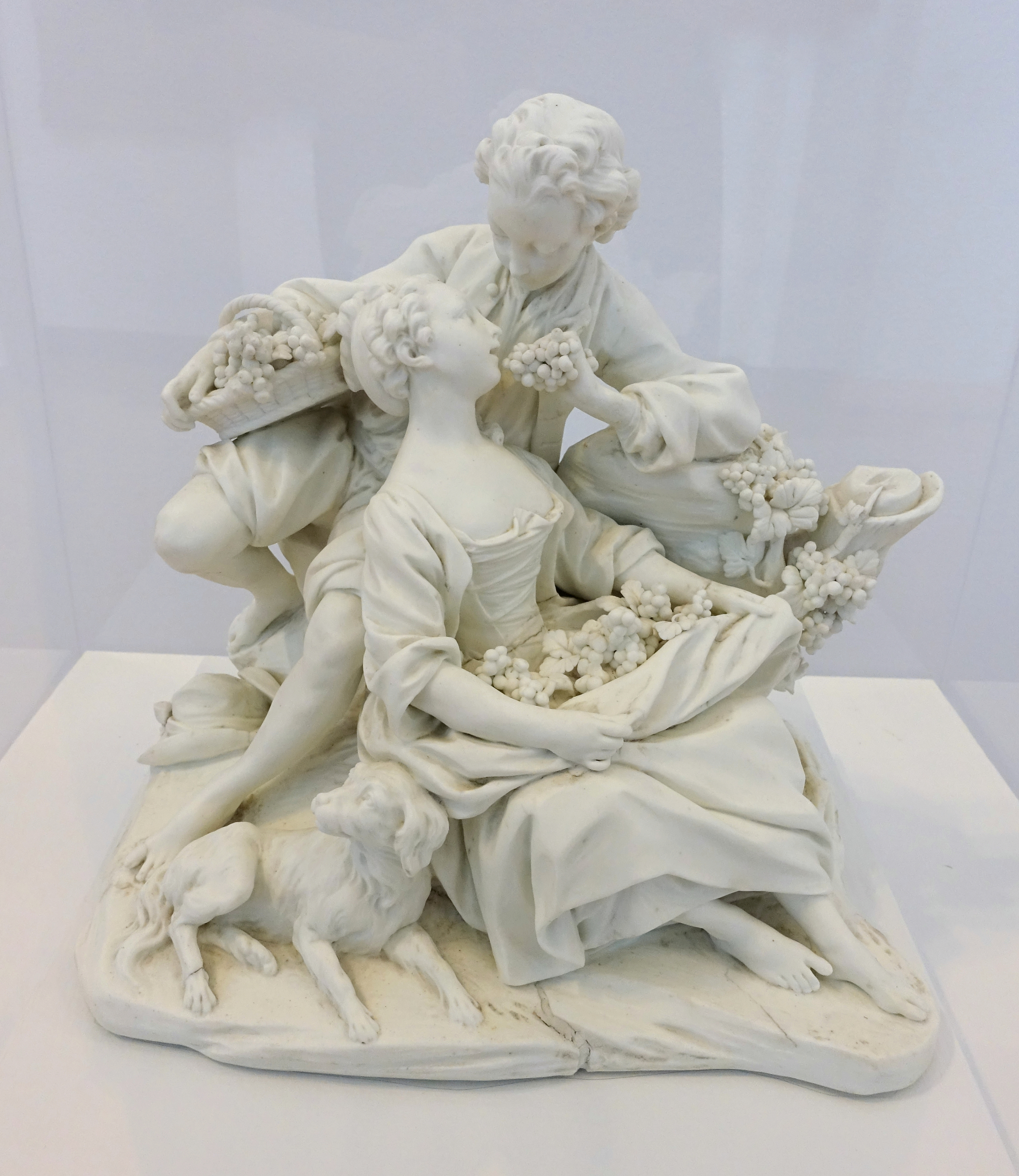
The Grape Eaters, after François Boucher, Vincennes, 1752, a very early biscuit porcelain group

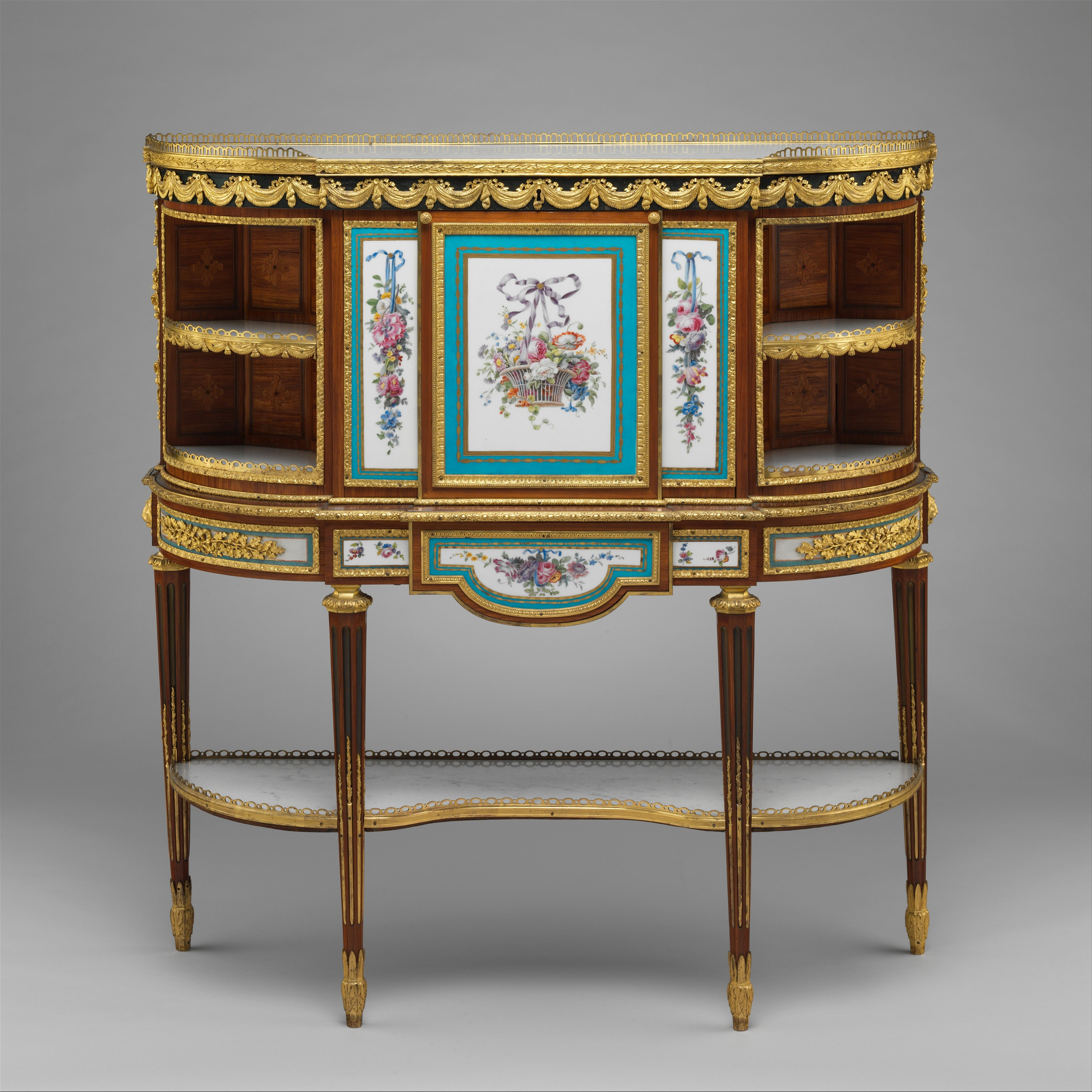
Drop-front desk (secrétaire à abattant or secrétaire en cabinet) with six Sèvres plaques, c. 1776

== Empire style ==
Even before the French revolution, the initially severe style of Neoclassicism had begun to turn grandiose and ornate in goods for the courts of the Ancien Régime. This trend deepened with the rise of Napoleon, which followed a difficult period for French porcelain factories. The Empire style was marked by lavish gilding, strong colours, and references to military conquests; Napoleon's ultimately unsuccessful expedition to Egypt sparked a fashion for "Neo-Egyptian" wares.

In 1800 Napoleon, as Minister of the Interior, appointed Alexandre Brongniart director at Sèvres; he was to stay 47 years, making many changes. The factory concentrated on tableware and larger decorative pieces such as vases and table centrepieces, much of it for the government to use or give as diplomatic presents.

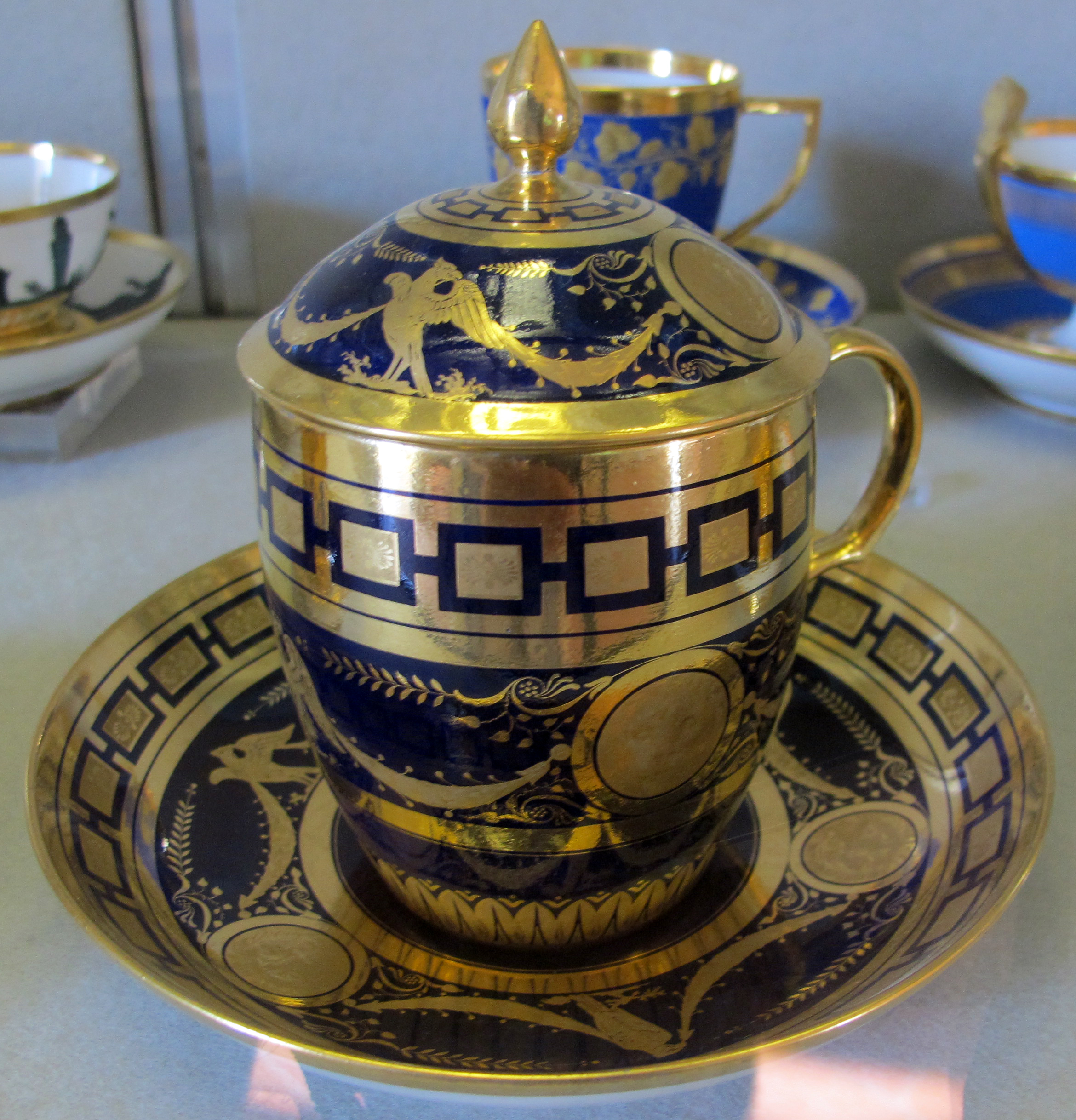
Cup and saucer, Dagoty, Paris, c. 1810

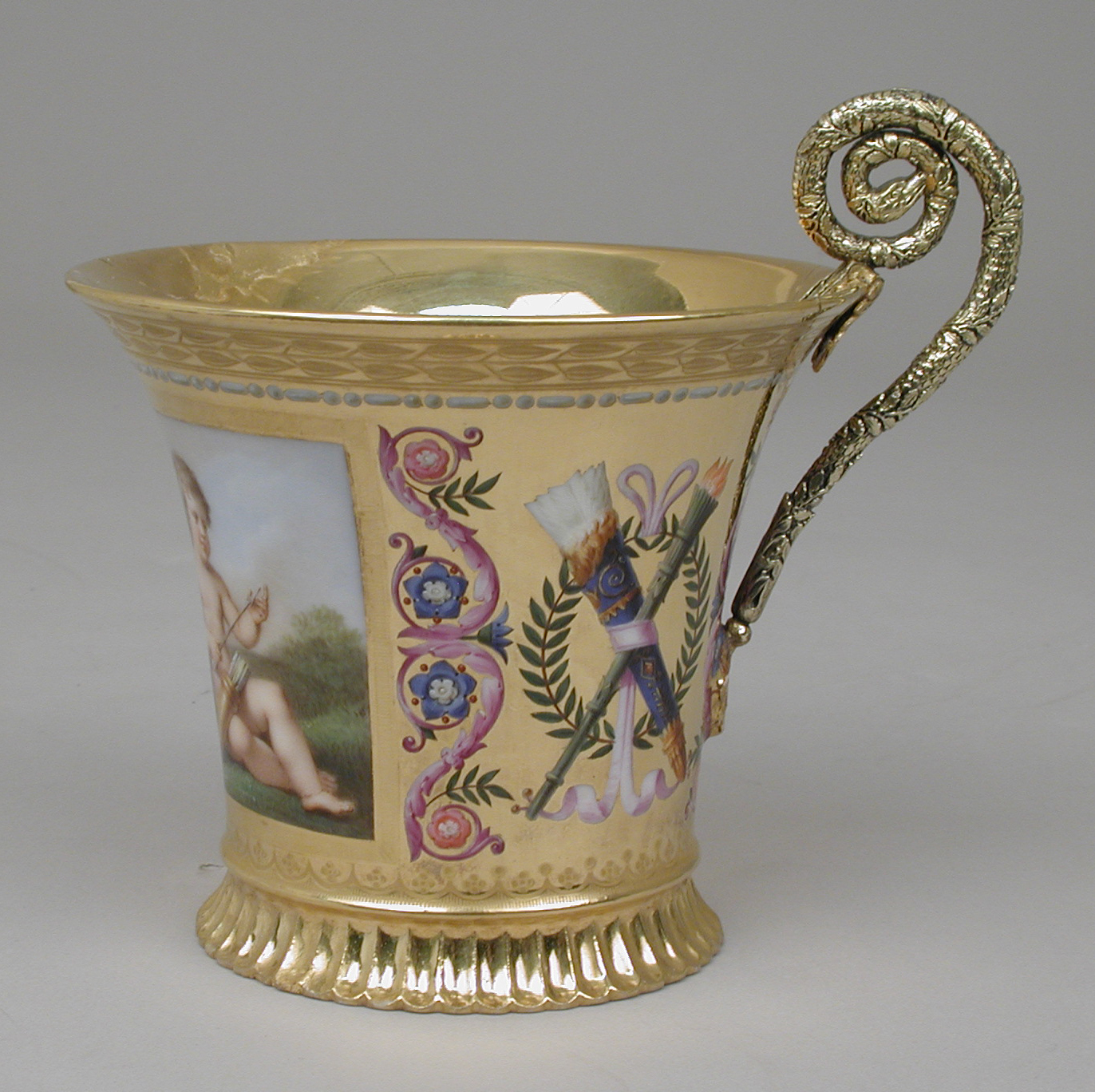
Sèvres cup with silver handle from a breakfast service

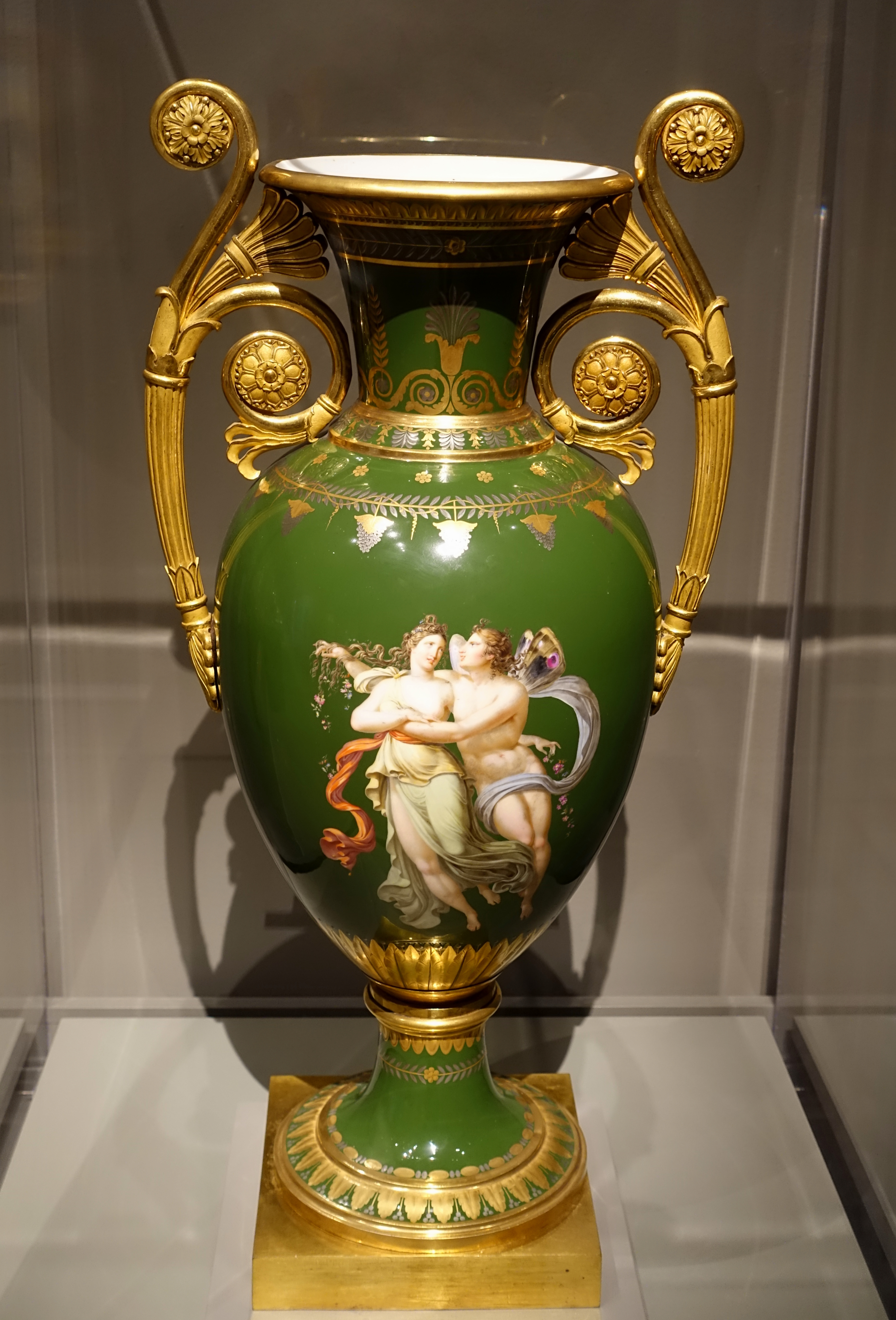
One of a pair of Sèvres vases, 1809

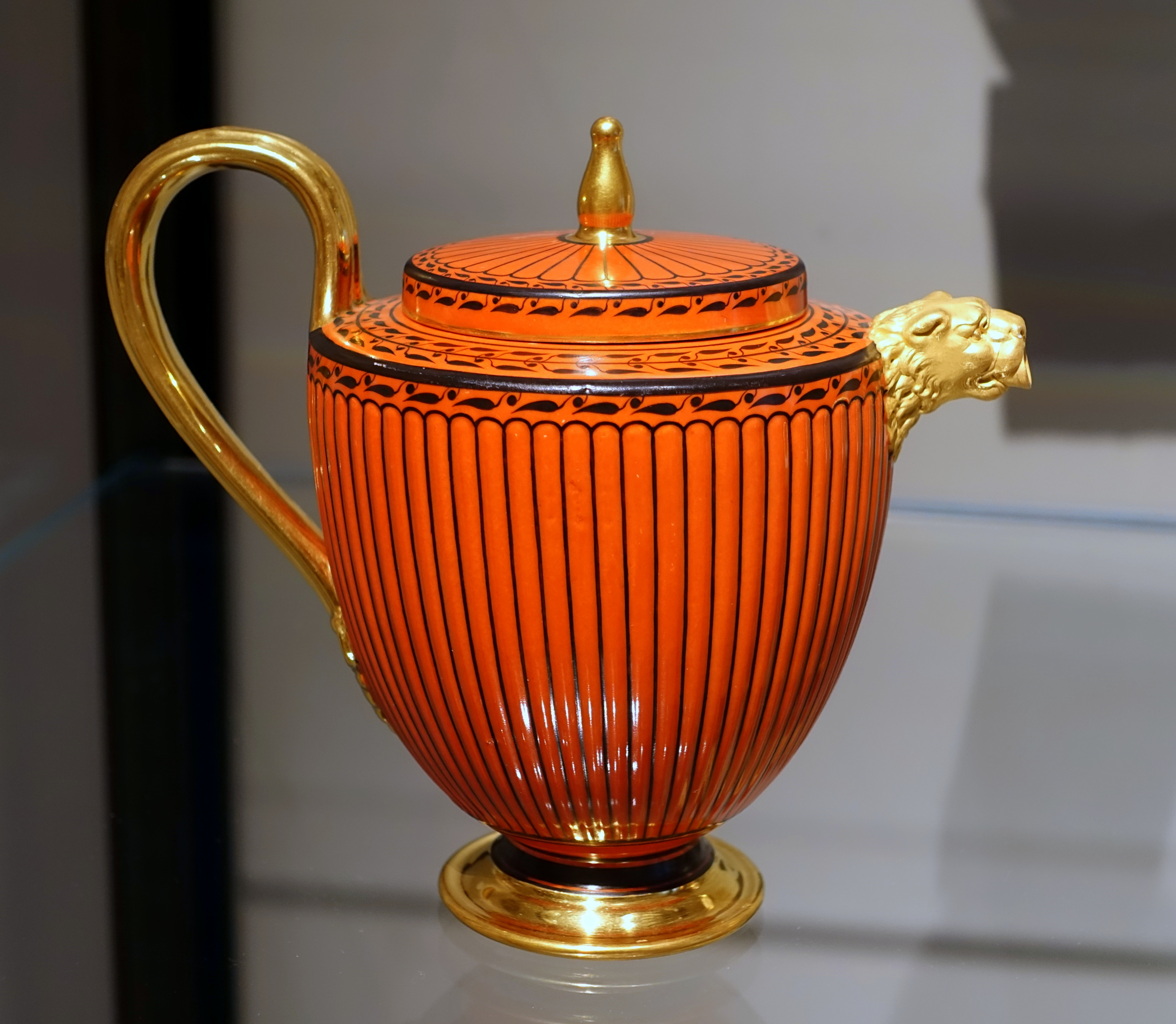
Teapot, Sèvres 1817

== 19th century ==
The Empire style grew more elaborate and ostentatious as the century continued, developing most aspects of "Victorian" taste in a French style. Under the Second Empire from 1852 to 1870; there was a revival of Louis XVI style at Sèvres, often more heavily painted and gilded. Many of the old moulds which the factory had kept were used again.

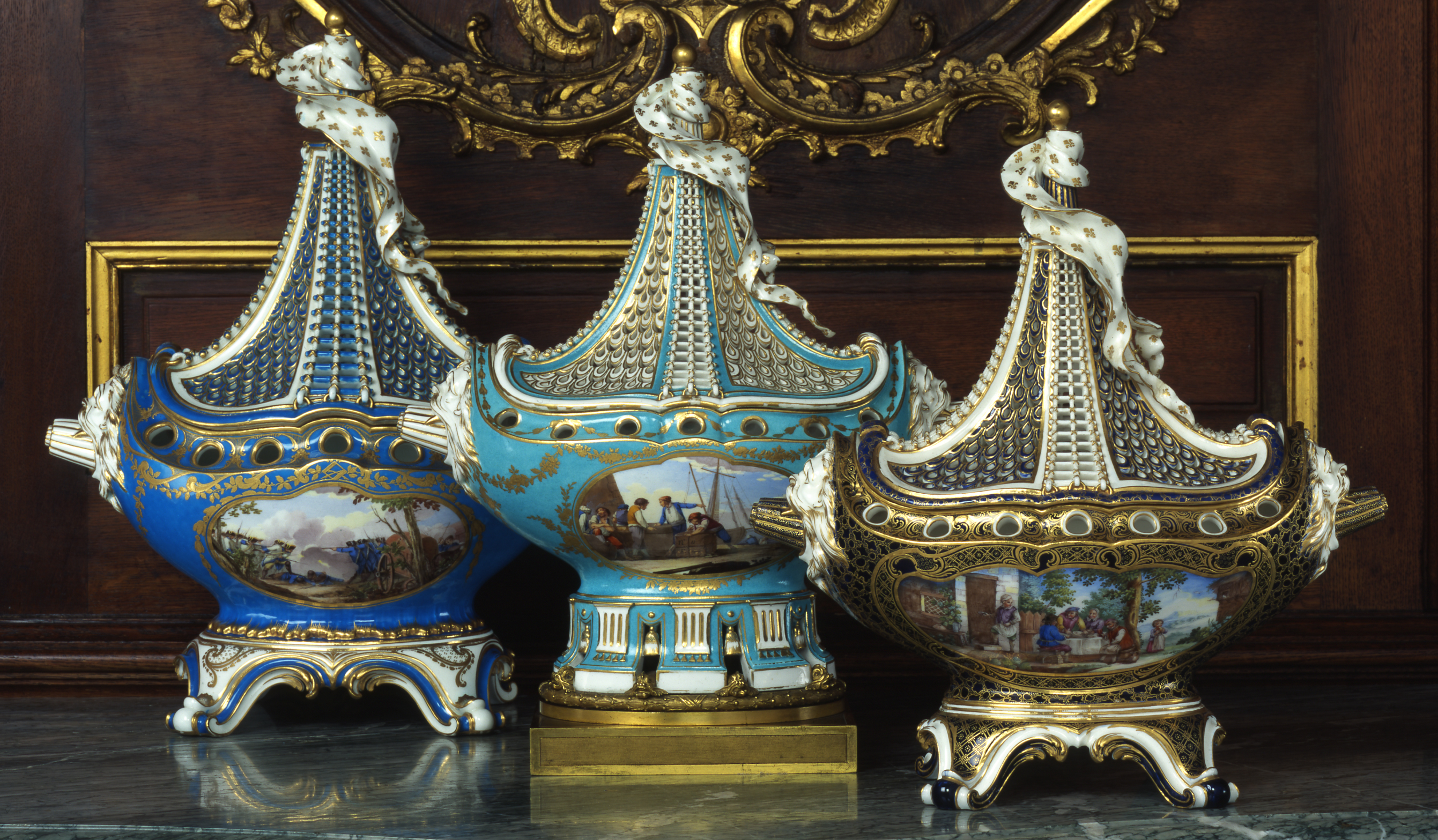
The three 'boat shaped' potpourri vases at Waddesdon Manor, around 1761

Apart from Sèvres, most factories had moved to Limoges by about 1830, with many companies making Limoges porcelain, of which Haviland & Co. was the most successful. This was founded in the 1840s by porcelain importers in America, and a strong market in America supported them through rough patches. They also led a reconnection of ceramics with contemporary trends in the fine arts, especially Japonisme, using artists such as Ernest Chaplet (though much of his work was in stoneware rather than porcelain) and Félix Bracquemond. Around Paris the factory of Jacob Petit at Fontainebleau opened in 1834, and the questionable career of Edmé Samson began in the same decade.

The French movement of art pottery in the late 19th century developed almost entirely within stoneware and faience, led by figures including Ernest Chaplet and Theodore Deck. This, to some extent following English Arts and Crafts Movement principles in integrating the design and craft production, and promoting new styles of design, eventually including Art Nouveau. But some figures later worked in porcelain, either with the large factories, or independently, as for example in the case of Auguste Delaherche. Sèvres turned to a more diluted version of Japonisme after 1870, and in 1897, a new artistic director, A. Sandier, introduced new Art Nouveau styles, followed about a decade later by styles leading to Art Deco.

The display of Sèvres porcelain in the English Country House is another by-product of the 19th century and flourishes especially within what is known as 'Rothschildshire' (the county of Buckinghamshire). The family's history of collecting and its development of the distinctive ‘goût Rothschild’ (Rothschild style) results in some of the most iconic Sèvres being located at Waddesdon Manor, Baron de Rothschild's weekend 'pleasure house'. As Mark Girouard writes, "opulence was the key-note of this" and thus "eighteenth-century French furniture, porcelain and bronzes of superb quality combined" dominated this specific 19th-century collection. Ferdinand's first purchase of Sèvres is a poignant narrative at Waddesdon manor, in which at 21 years old, he treated himself to the famous turquoise Sèvres 'boat shaped' potpourri vase "which he bought in instalments and is still at Waddesdon".

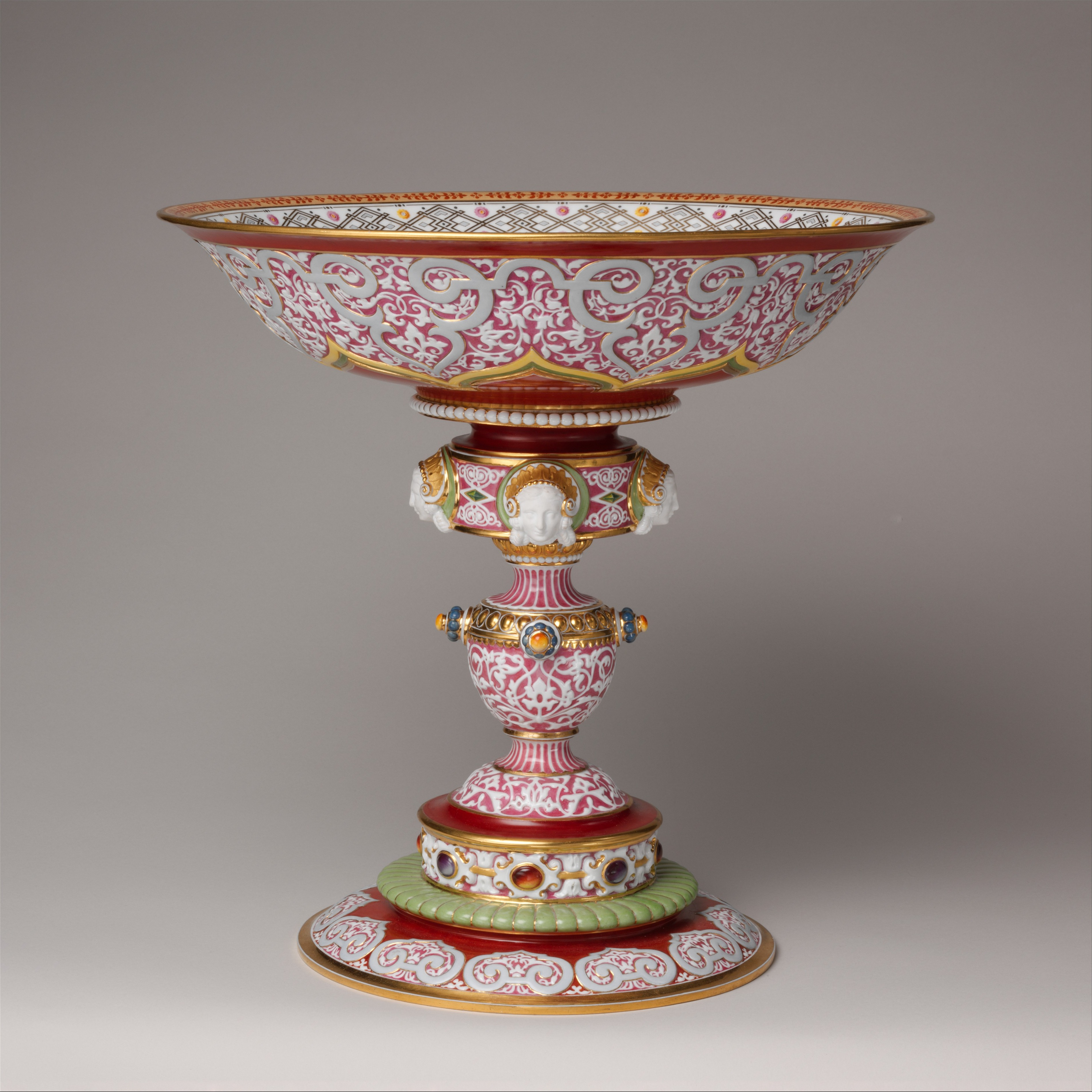
Sèvres cup, 1837, imitating Renaissance metalwork and Limoges enamel

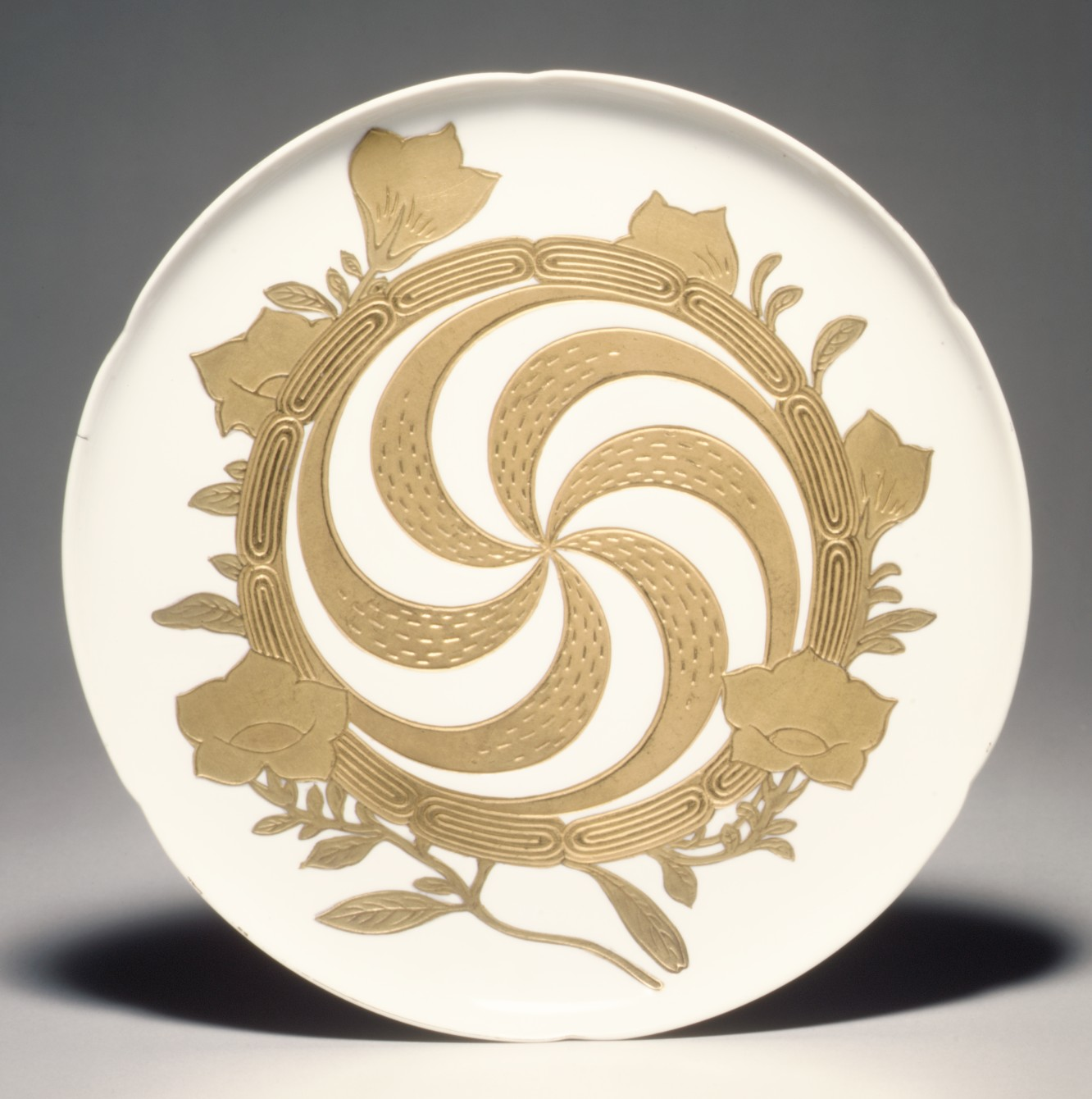
Plate designed by Félix Bracquemond for Haviland & Co., 1870s

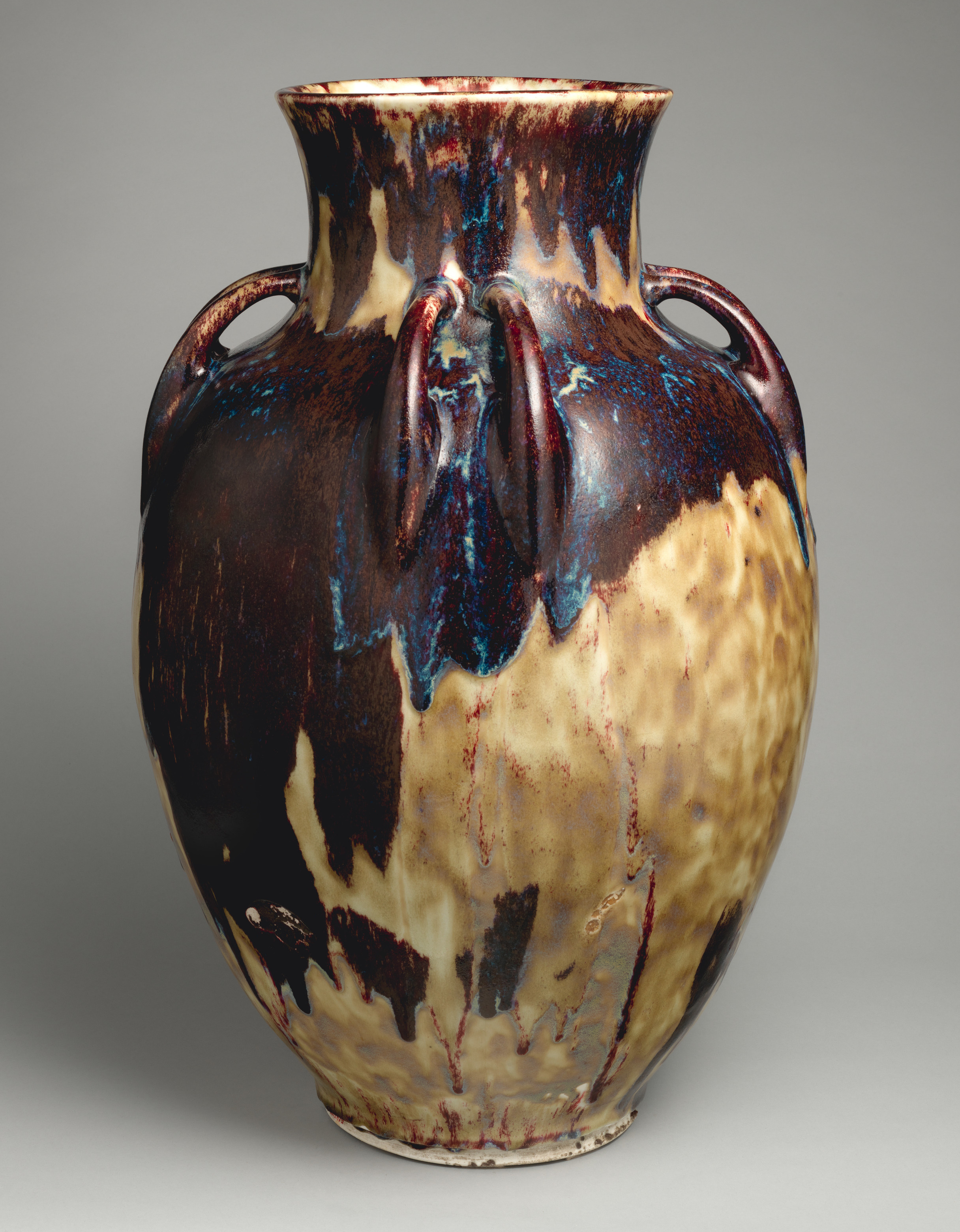
Vase by Ernest Chaplet, c. 1890

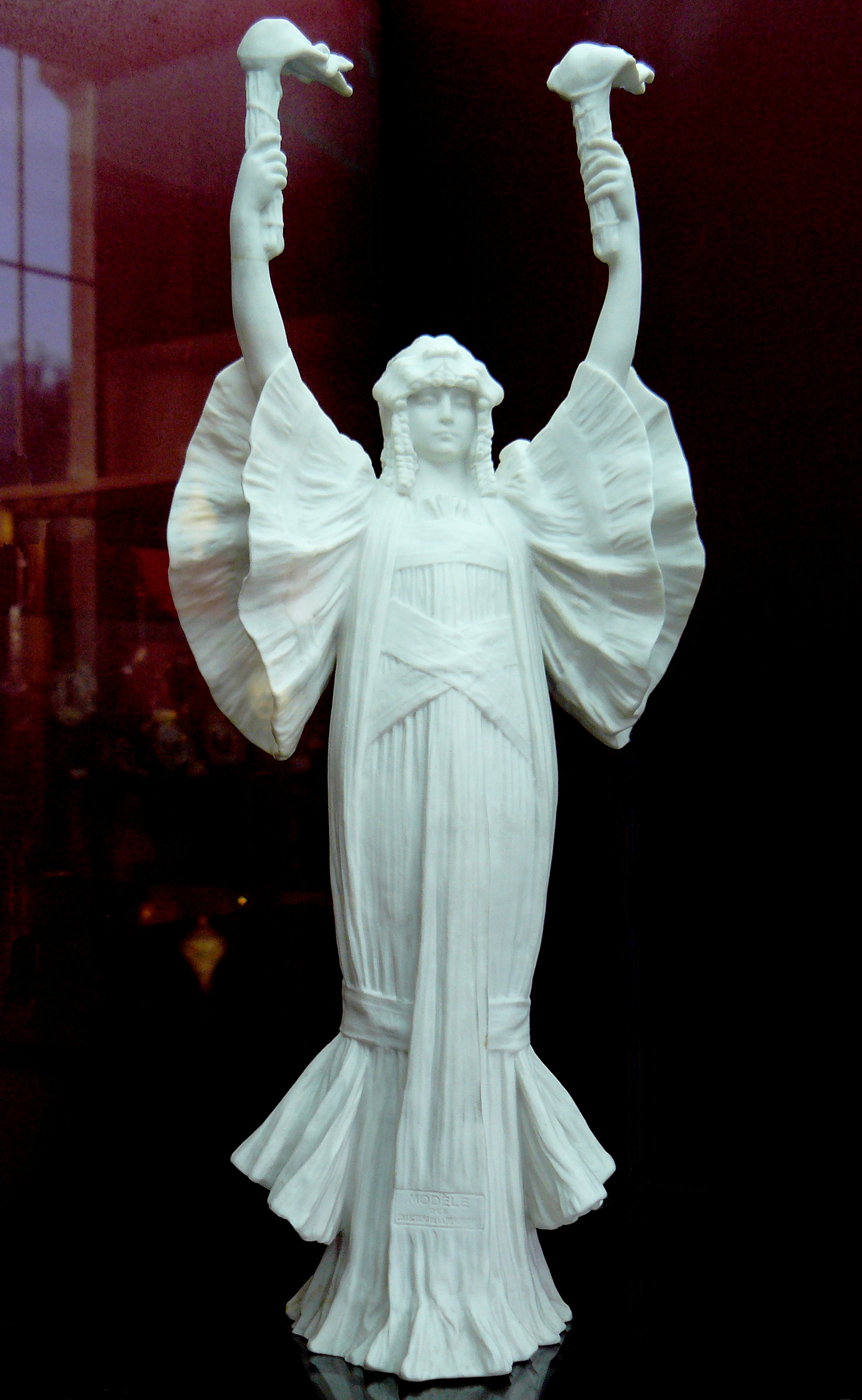
Sèvres figure in biscuit, for the Paris Exposition Universelle (1900)

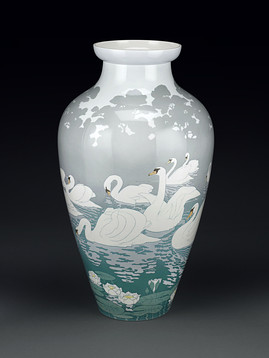
Sèvres swan vase, for the Paris Exposition Universelle (1900)

== See also ==
- Orientalism in early modern France
