= NAST =

NAST may refer to:

- Nepal Academy of Science and Technology
- SAP Nachrichtensteuerung, a messaging concept used by SAP-Systems
- North American Society of Toxinology

== See also ==
- Nast (disambiguation)
