= Jean Népomucène Hermann Nast =

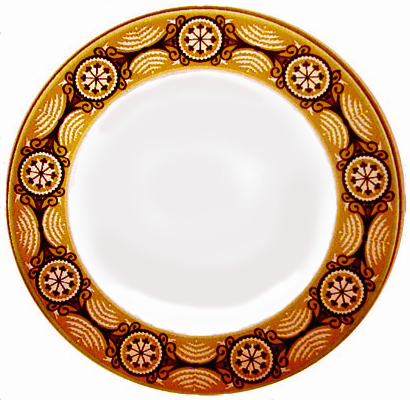
Hard-paste porcelain with gilt relief plate, 1806, from the state porcelain service produced for U.S. President James Madison for use at the White House.

Jean Népomucène Hermann Nast (1754–1817) was founder of a porcelain manufacture who pioneered a process of high relief, multicolored hard-paste porcelain.

== Biography ==
Nast was born in Austria. He worked at a state porcelain workshop at the Palace of Versailles before starting his own factory, the manufacture de Nast, in 1783. There, Nast collaborated with French chemist Louis-Nicolas Vauquelin in introducing new intensely colored glazes. At the beginning of the 19th century the manufacture had risen to prominence, rivalling the manufacture nationale de Sèvres, supplying French nobility, the government of the French Directory, Napoleon I, and many European courts.

Following Nast's death at Paris in 1817, his sons continued to operate the factory until its sale in 1835.
