= Manufacture de Nast =

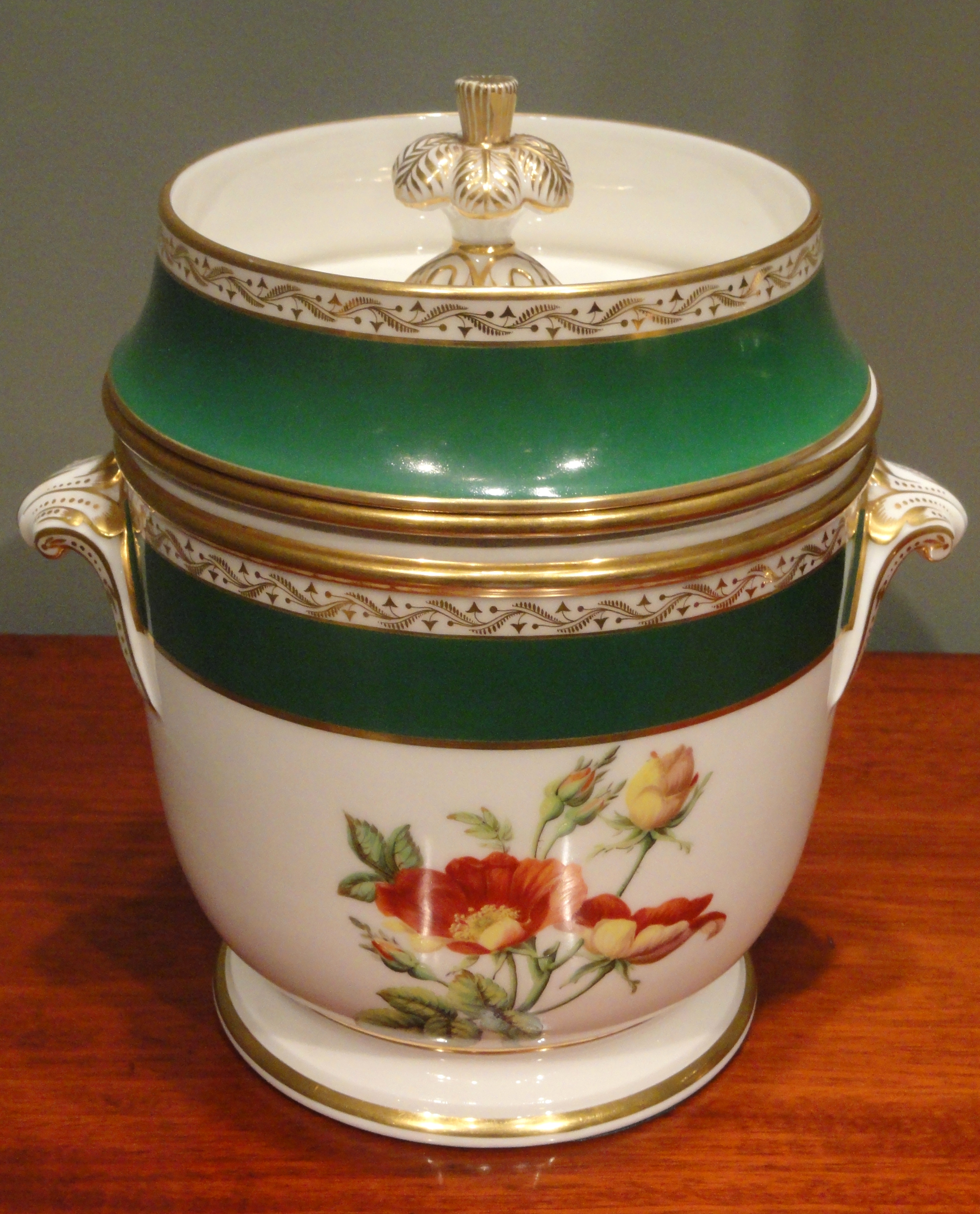
Dessert cooler, 1815-20

The manufacture de Nast was a prominent hard-paste porcelain factory founded in Paris in 1783 by Jean Népomucène Hermann Nast, an Austrian born French citizen. Nast porcelain was produced until 1835, and was one of a number of factories making very high-quality porcelain in Paris in this period, such as Dihl and Guérhard. This contrasted with London, where the factories had all closed or removed north by 1775, although the capital remained, like Paris, a centre for decorating plain "blanks" made elsewhere - in France often in Limoges porcelain.

== History ==
After working at a porcelain manufacturer in Versailles, Nast opened his own small factory in Paris in 1783. Following its successes through sales to the government of the French Directory and the court of Napoleon I the firm needed increased production and Nast with his two sons opened a large factory located on the rue du Chemin-Vert in the 11th arrondissement of Paris in 1806. At the rue du Chemin Vert location Nast employed new techniques for the application of gold porcelain in high bas-relief. Nast patented this process in 1810. The manufacture de Nast was also in the forefront of developing new highly pigmented color glazes. Working with French chemist Louis Vauquelin, the first to isolate the element chromium in 1797 created an intense malachite green glaze called viridian that was able to remain stable at very high temperatures.

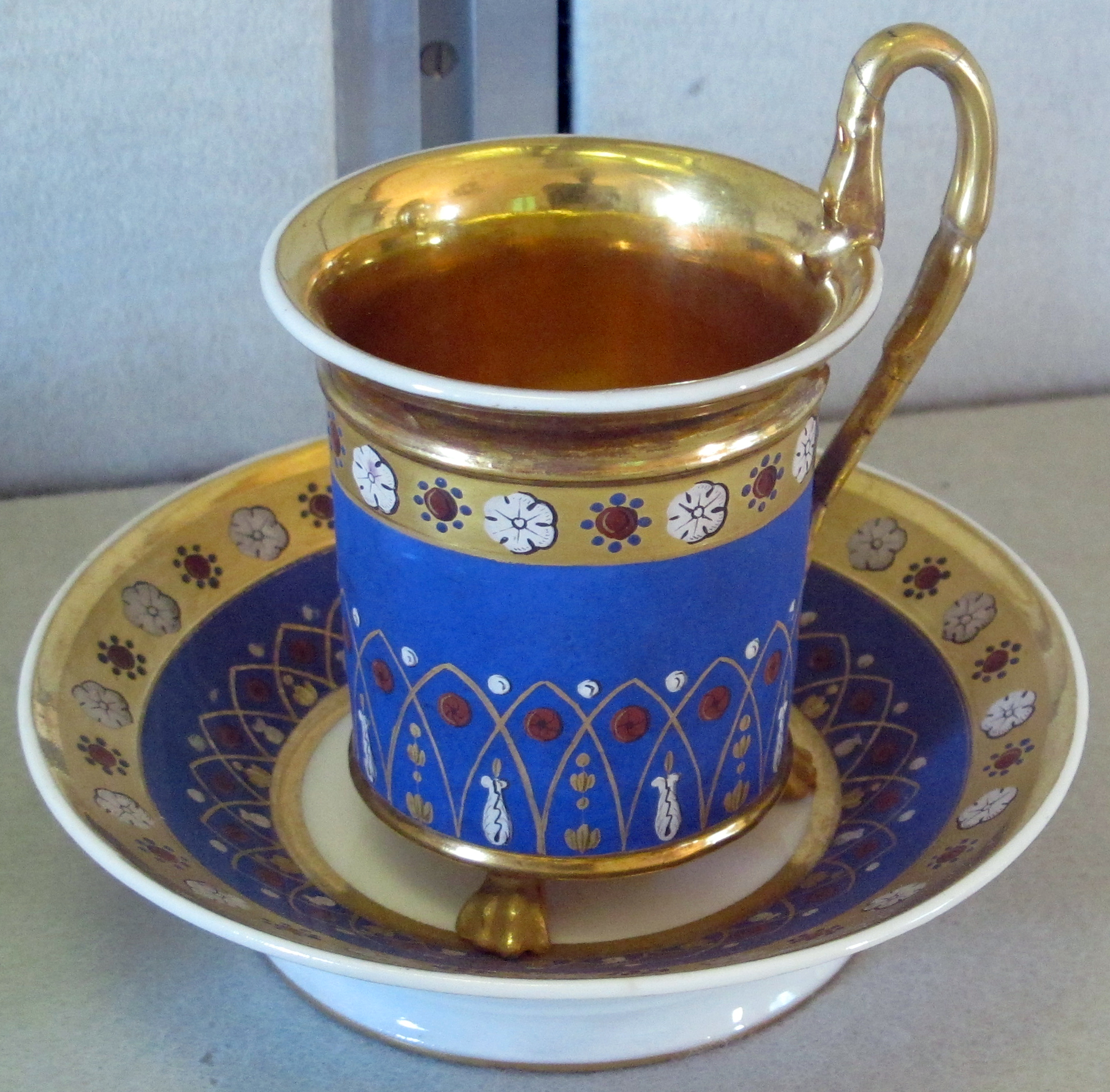
Cup and saucer, 1810-15.

The firm's products were sold to the French upper class and to several courts of Europe, as well as one of the earliest state china services, used by President James Madison in the White House in or about 1814 (purchased privately on Madison's behalf in 1806 when he was secretary of state, and used by him as president after the burning of the mansion and its contents by the British in the War of 1812).

Following the death of Nast in 1817, the factory continued under the leadership of his sons. Visiting an exhibit of the firm's wares at the Louvre during the Paris Exposition of 1819 (also called the Restoration Exposition), Louis XVIII gave Nast's sons praise - "I observe with great pleasure the talent passed from father to son, I urge you to cultivate this."

Nast's two sons continued management of the manufacture de Nast until its sale in 1835.

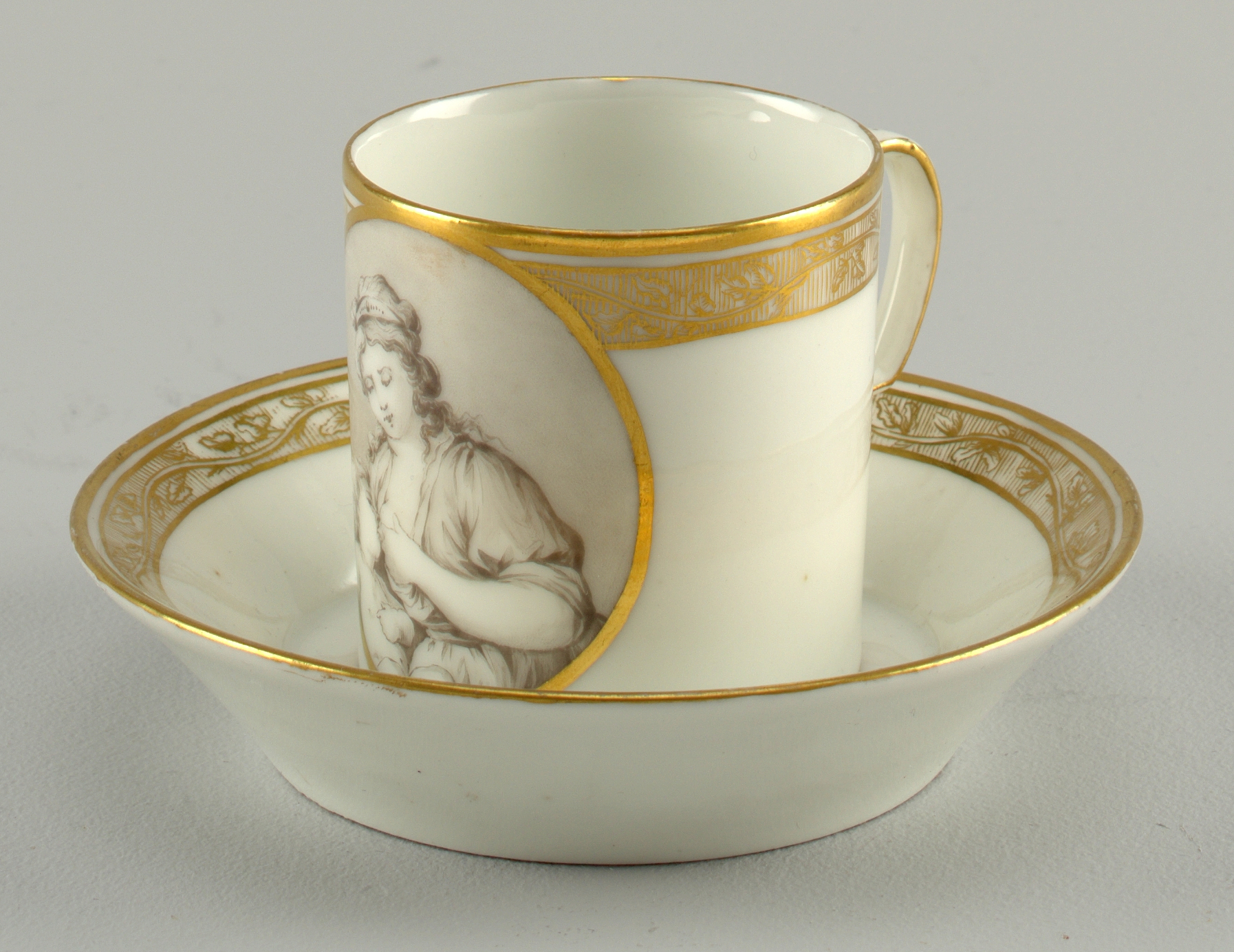
Cup And Saucer, 1790

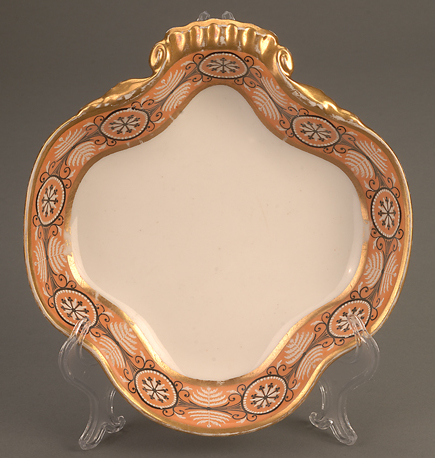
James Madison serving dish 1809

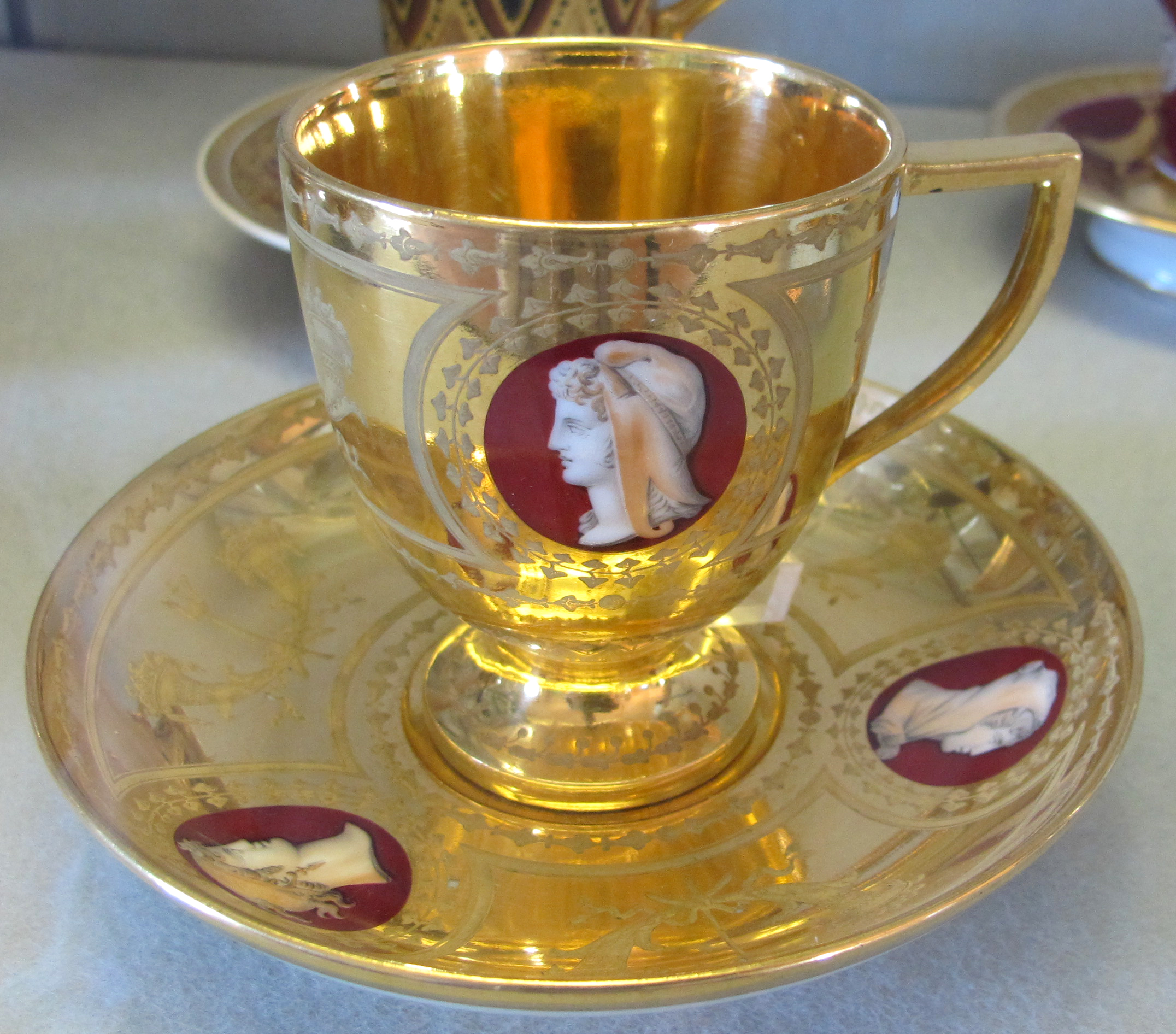
Cup And Saucer, 1810-1815
