= Dihl and Guérhard porcelain =

French porcelain factory (1781–1828)

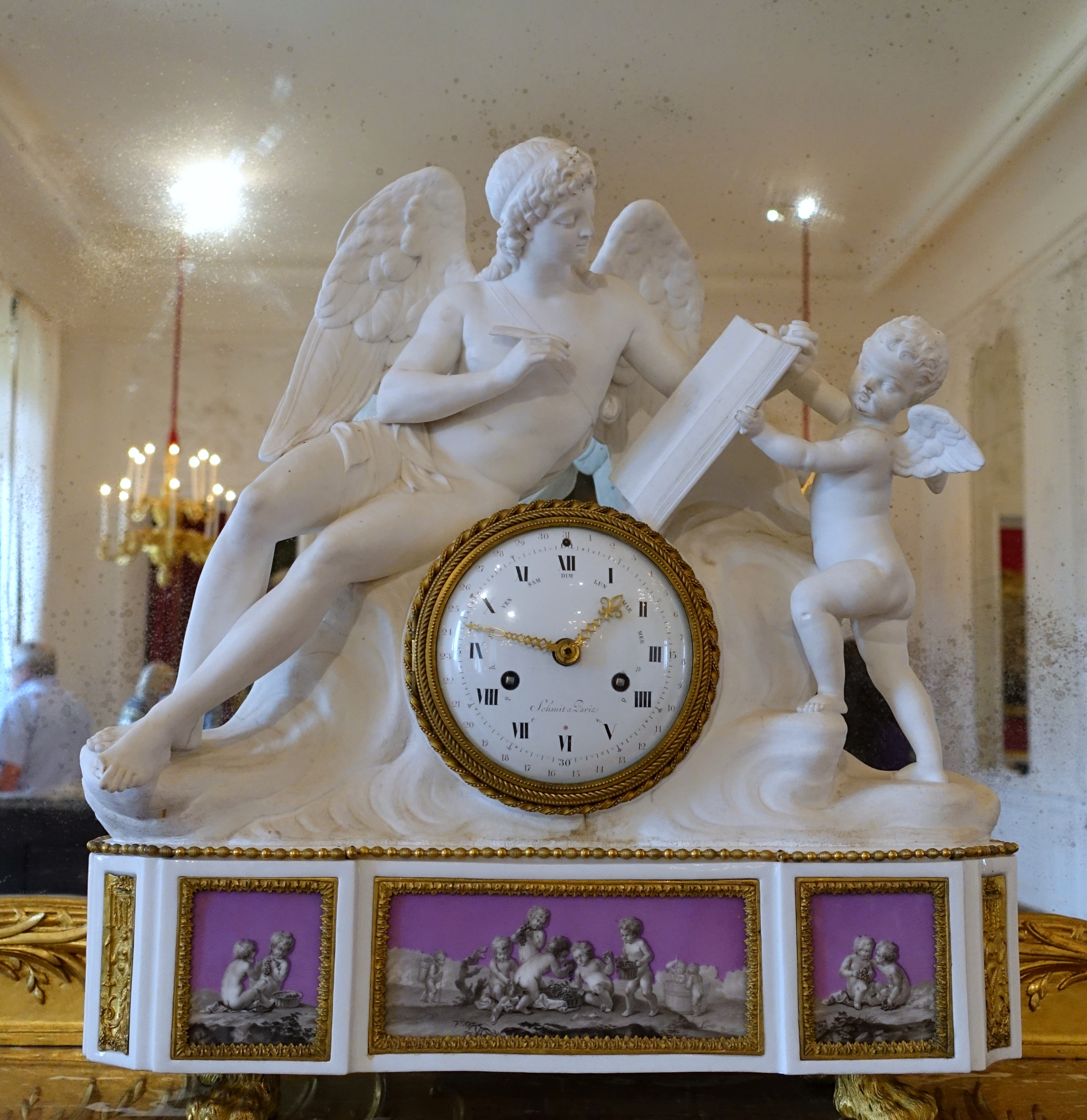
Clock by Jean-Nicolas Schmit, Paris, with biscuit porcelain figures, c. 1785-1790

Dihl and Guérhard porcelain (various variant names) was made by the Duc d'Angoulême's porcelain factory, a hard-paste porcelain factory in Paris, active from February 25, 1781, until 1828. It was founded by Christophe Dihl (1752-1830) and Antoine Guérhard (d.1793), together with Louise-Françoise-Madeleine Croizé (1751-1831), then married to Guérhard, but married to Dihl from 1797. Dihl was a chemist, and the factory experimented with new colours and finishes.

== Patronage ==
From an early stage, it operated under the protection, though not the ownership, of the child Louis Antoine, Duke of Angoulême, (1775-1844), a nephew of the reigning King Louis XVI. This permitted it to operate despite the monopoly on coloured and gilded porcelain the King had given his own Sèvres porcelain. The Duke's name was dropped during the French Revolution.

== Styles ==
The wares were of very high quality, in styles similar to Sèvres, following the movement of fashion from Neoclassicism to the Empire style. Empress Joséphine commissioned a service in 1811, with Dutch Golden Age paintings of genre subjects, in gilded Neoclassical settings, a somewhat surprising combination already used by Sèvres before the Revolution. A particular specialty was vases which imitated polished stone or tortoiseshell in porcelain, some in the slim fuseau shape and mounted with ormolu.

== Abbreviation ==
An abbreviated version of the formal name "Manufacture de Monsieur Le Duc d’Angoulême" was sometimes stamped underneath pieces, and a mark of G and A intertwined was used. The factory's original location was rue de Bondy, Paris, but it moved to rue du Temple in 1789.

Tray with birds, 1780s

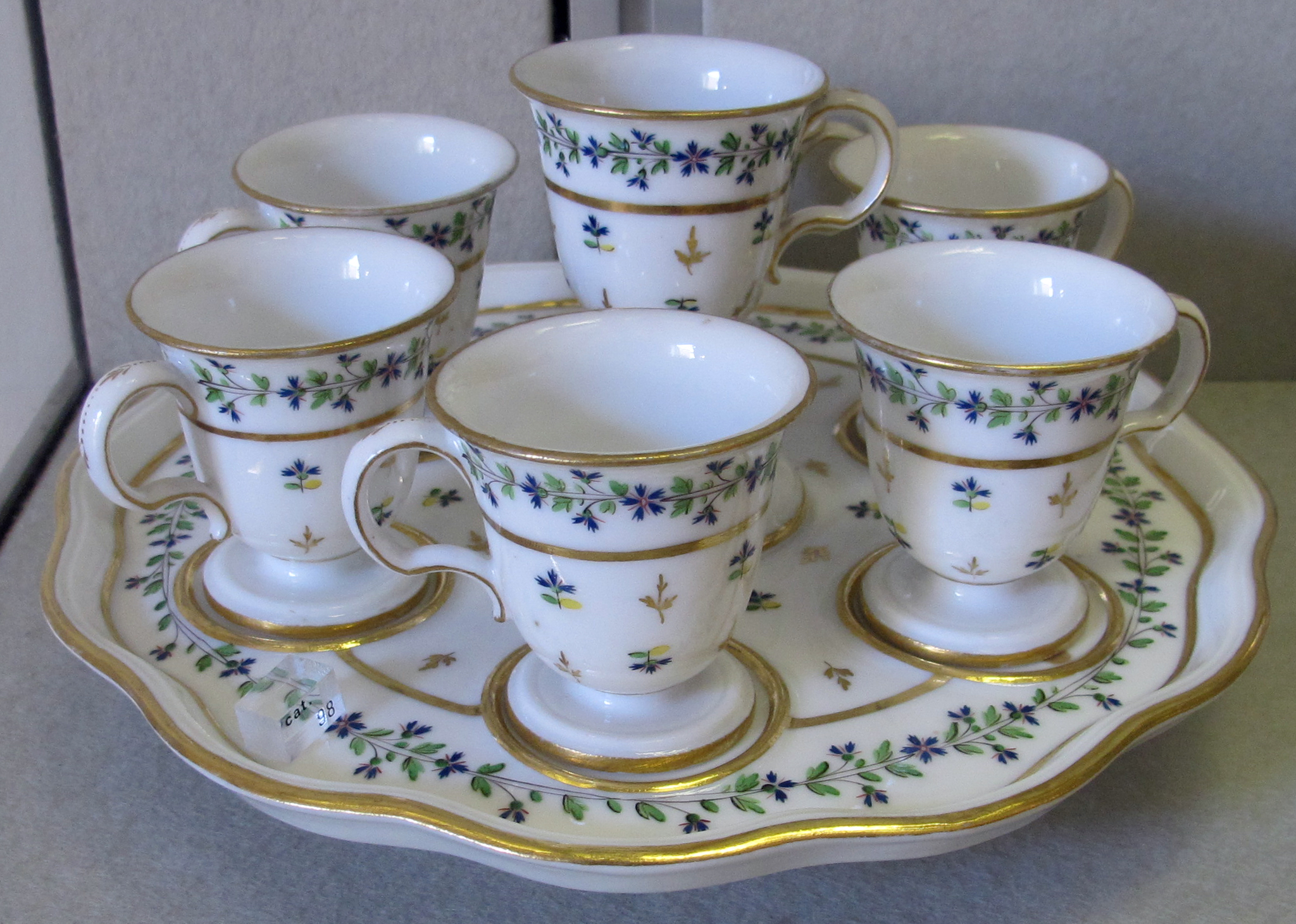
Cups and tray, c. 1790

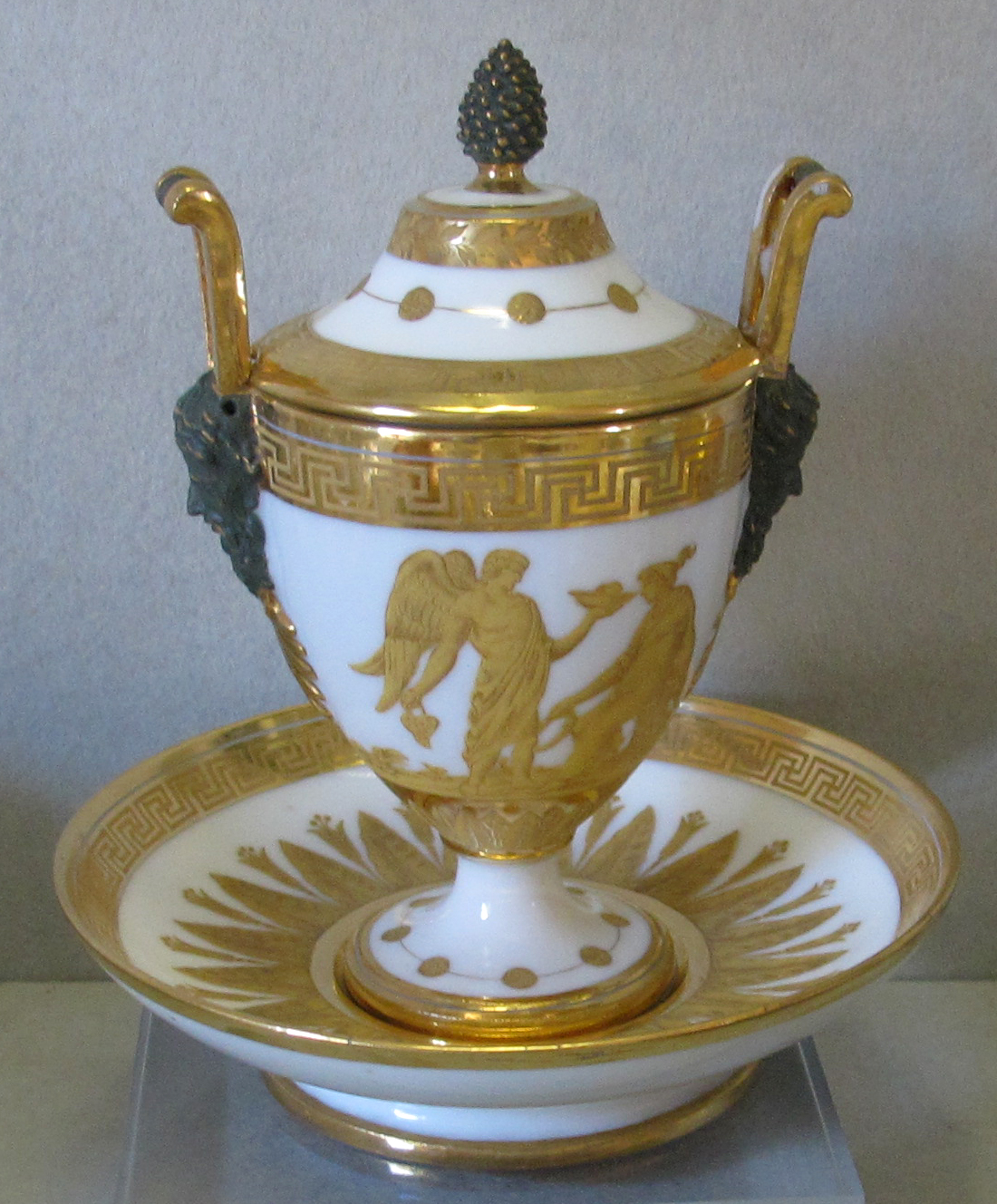
Neoclassical covered vessel, c. 1790

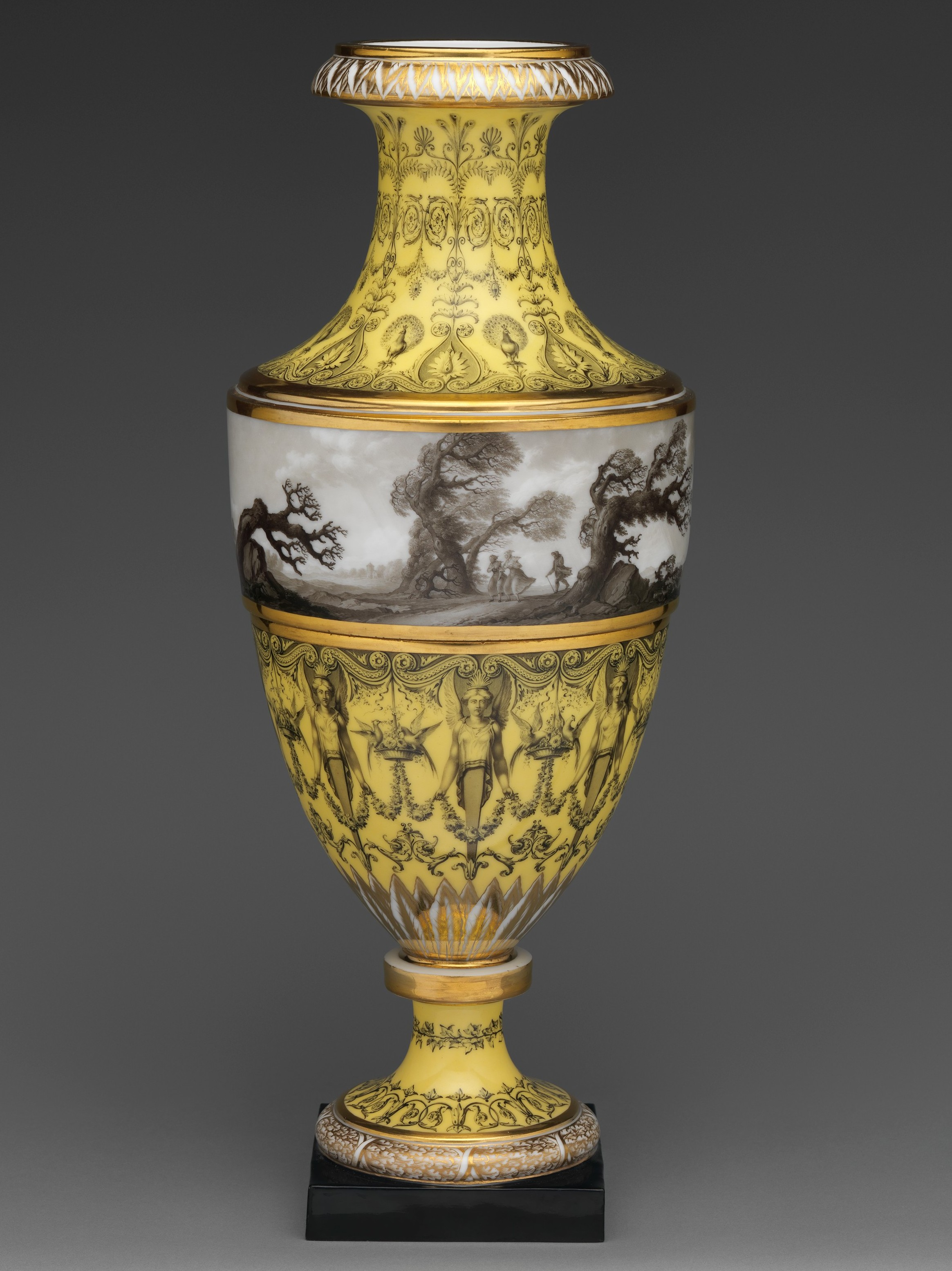
Vase with scenes of storm on land, 1790–95

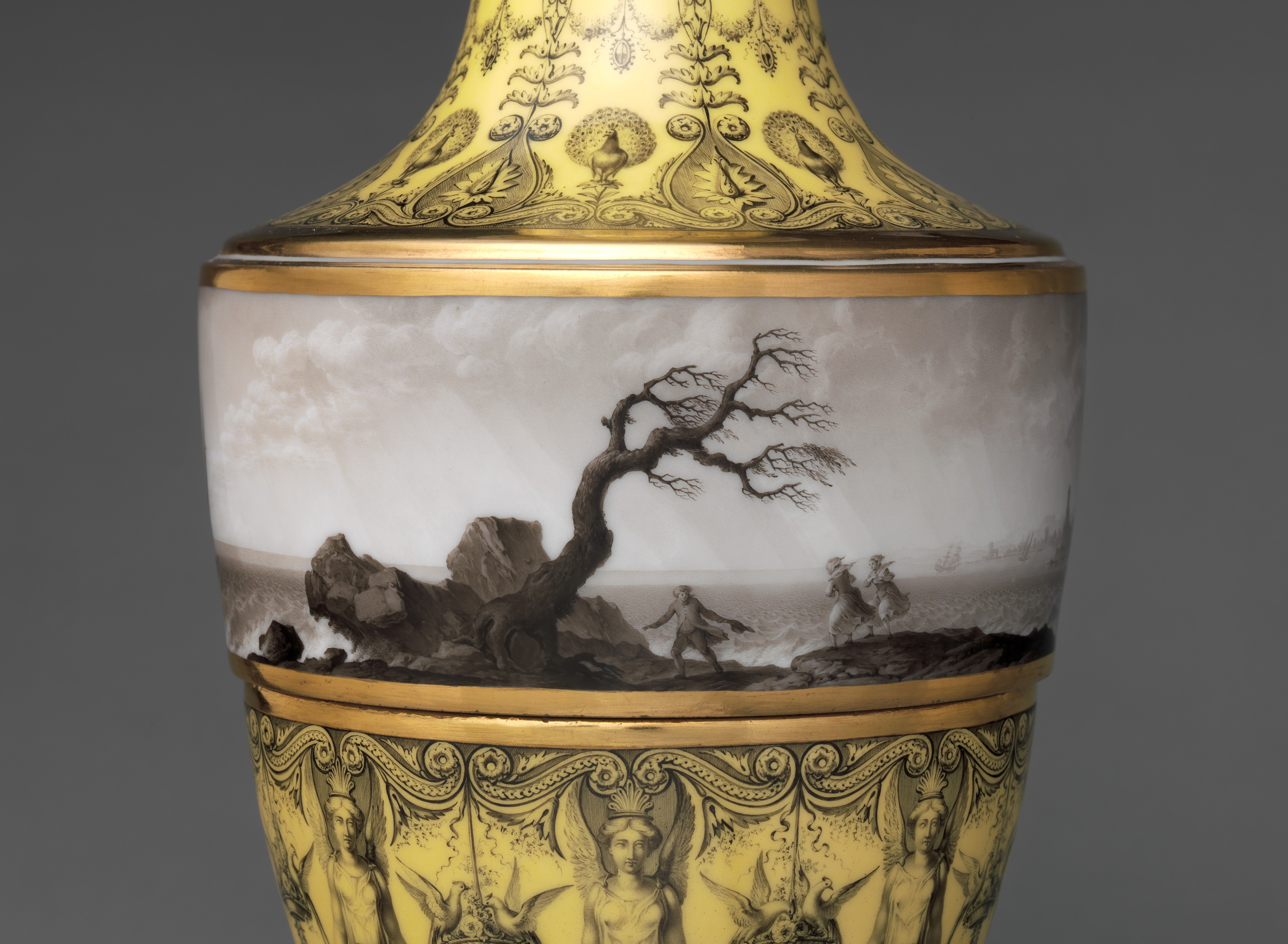
Detail, vase with scenes of storm at sea, pair of the last.

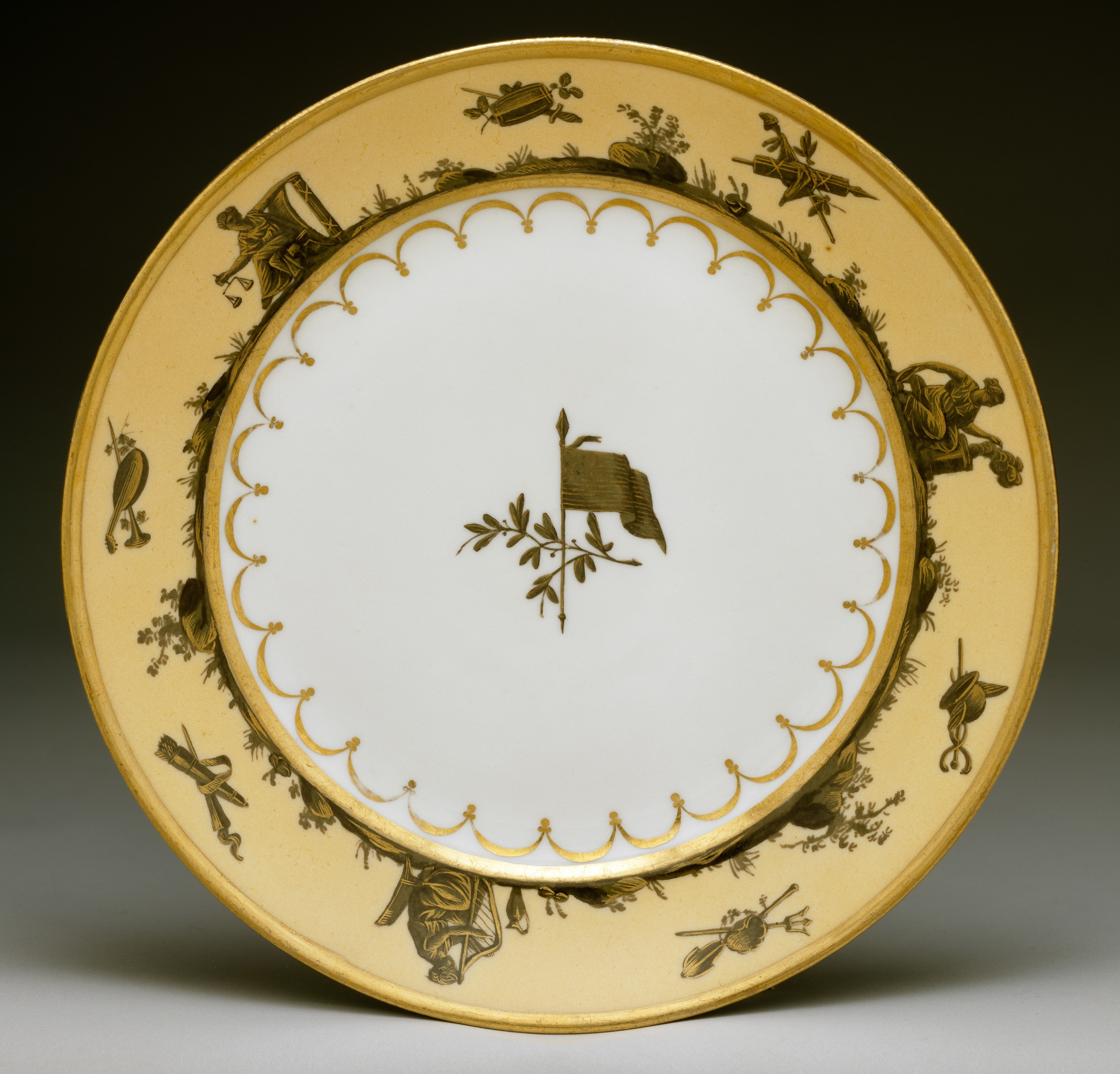
Plate from a service designed for the American market, c. 1800-1815

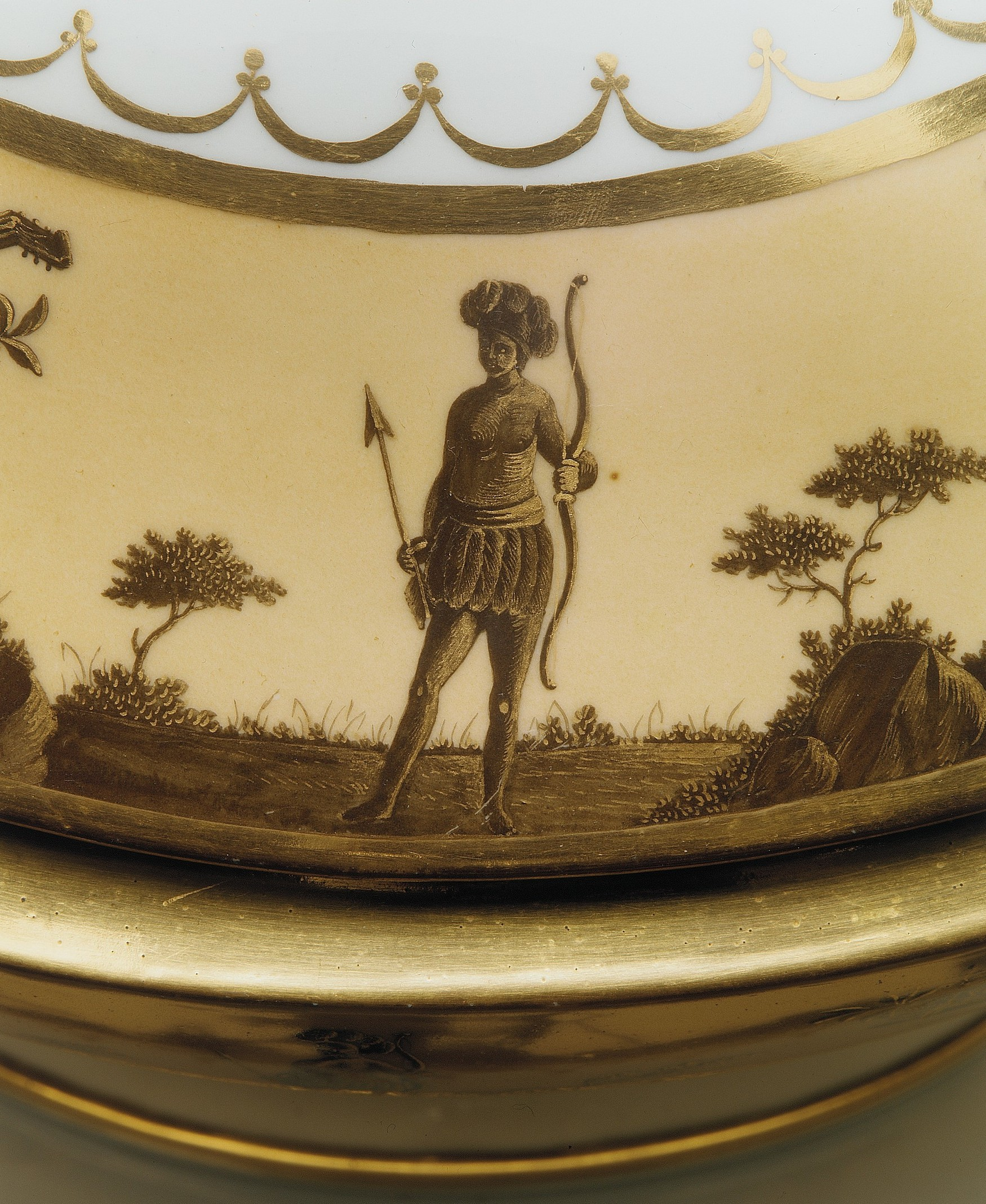
American Indian from a tureen in the same service.

Detail of cup, c. 1820
