= Bristol porcelain =

Ceramics made in Bristol, England

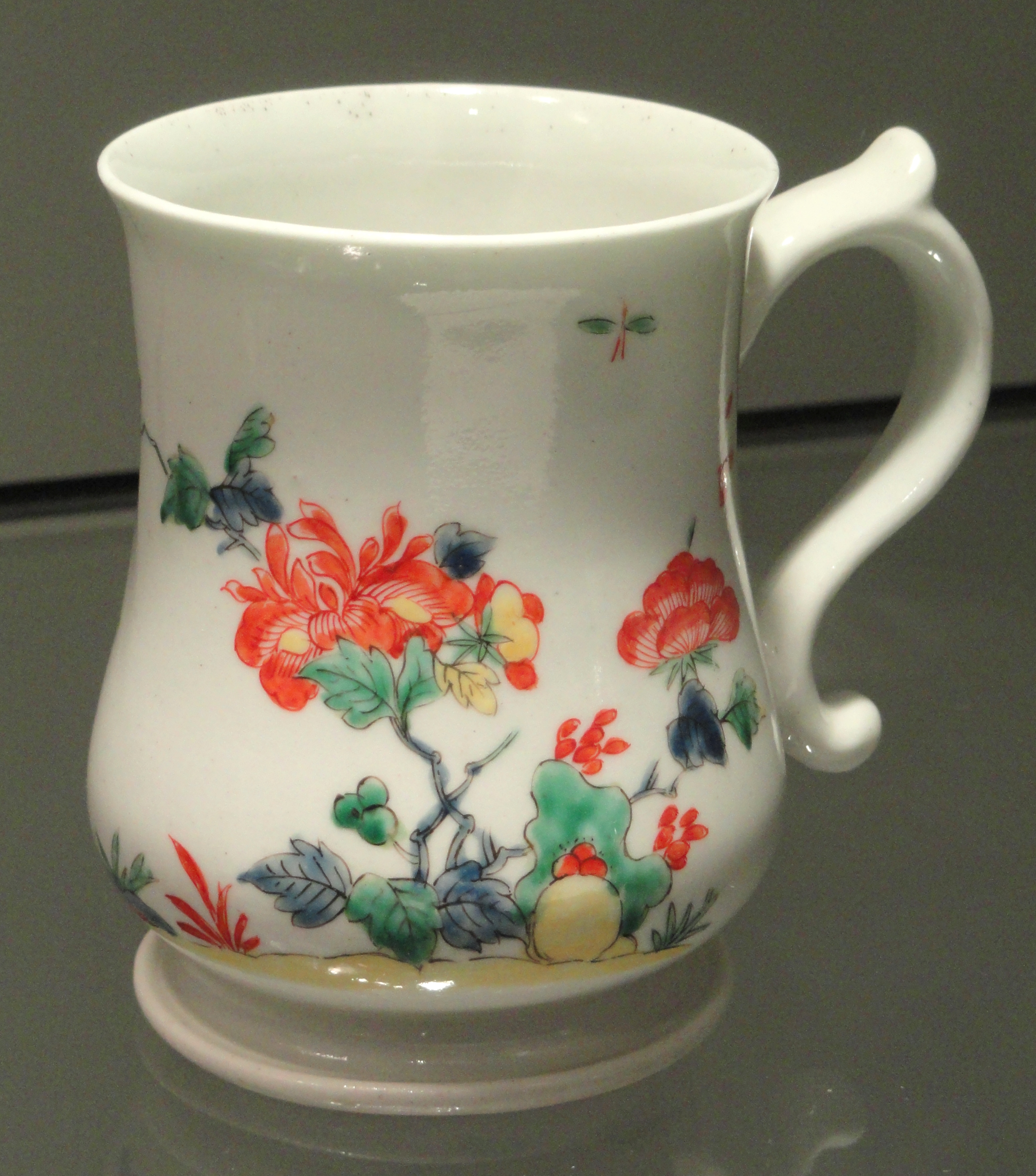
Mug, c. 1748–1752, Lund's Bristol factory, soft-paste porcelain with overglaze enamels.

Bristol porcelain covers porcelain made in Bristol, England by several companies in the 18th and 19th centuries. The plain term "Bristol porcelain" is most likely to refer to the factory moved from Plymouth in 1770, the second Bristol factory. The product of the earliest factory is usually called Lund's Bristol ware and was made from about 1750 until 1752, when the operation was merged with Worcester porcelain; this was soft-paste porcelain.

In 1770 the Plymouth porcelain factory, which made England's first hard-paste porcelain, moved to Bristol, where it operated until 1782. This called itself the Bristol China Manufactory.

A further factory called the Water Lane Pottery made non-porcelain earthenware very successfully from about 1682 until the 1880s, and briefly made porcelain in about 1845–50.

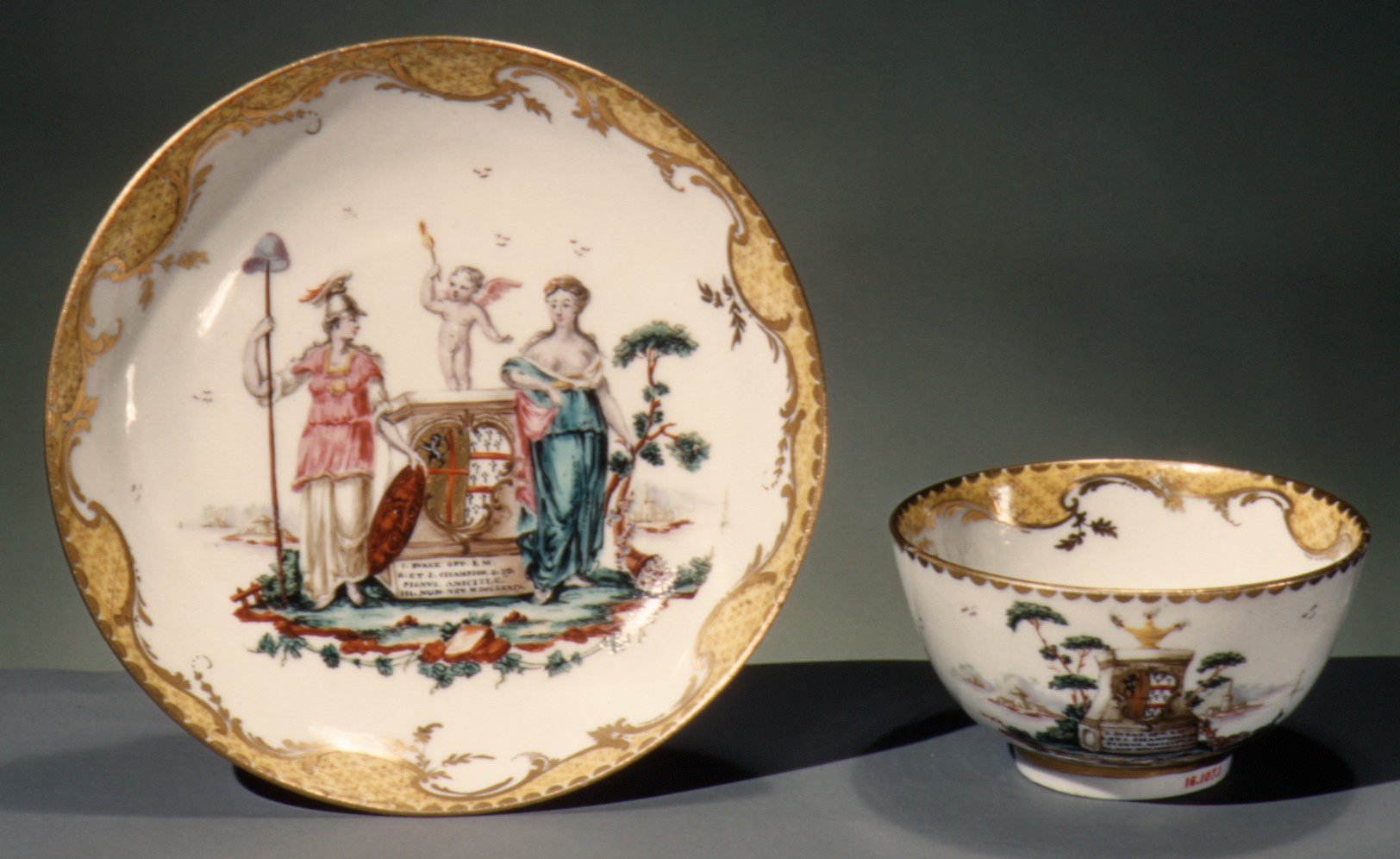
Cup and saucer, 1774, from the Champion period. The Latin inscription reads: "R. and J. Champion gave this as a token of friendship to J. Burke the best of British wives, on the third day of November, 1774". This was Jane, Mrs Edmund Burke; Champion was a friend, who helped Burke's election that year as a Bristol MP.

Bristol was England's second business city after London in the mid-18th century, and a major port for the Atlantic trade. It had long been, after London and together with Liverpool, one of the major centres of production for English pottery, especially tin-glazed English Delftware, some of which aspired to keep up with fashions in decoration such as chinoiserie. This part of the industry continued well into the 19th century, while the various porcelain producers proved short-lived. Bristol was also the largest city in the West Country, which includes the Cornish sites where china stone, an essential ingredient for hard-paste porcelain and bone china, was discovered in the 1740s.

== Lund's Bristol ==
Benjamin Lund was a Bristol Quaker whose main business was as a brass-founder. On 7 March 1748/9 he was granted a license for "soaprock", perhaps indicating the start of his porcelain operation. A letter of a Dr Richard Pococke from 1750 reports being shown near Lizard Point, Cornwall, a deposit "mostly valued for making porcelane ... and they get five pounds a ton for the manufacture of porcelane now carrying on at Bristol". The Cornish china stone was apparently first noticed by the Quaker pharmacist William Cookworthy (1705-1780) around 1745; he was to found Plymouth porcelain, which moved to become the next Bristol factory. Cookworthy had family in Bristol, and it seems likely that the two Quakers knew each other.

Lund had a partner, William Miller, a "grocer and banker", a necessity as Lund was bankrupt at the time. A previous tenant of the premises was a Mr Lowdin, who died in 1745, and had nothing to do with the porcelain business, but this was not clear to early scholars, and older sources sometimes talk of a phantom "Lowdin's Porcelain Manufactory".

The factory only operated in Bristol until mid-1752, when Dr. Wall and his partners in Worcester porcelain bought the business and moved everything to Worcester. Pieces that are certainly made in Bristol in 1748? to 1752, rather than Worcester in the years after are extremely rare, but there are some with "Bristoll" in raised letters, including sauce-boats and copies of a figure of "Chinaman" that are moulded from a cast of a Chinese original. Sauce-boats and their saucers, with shapes adapted from silversmithing, are among the most common pieces. Decoration could be underglaze blue "usually badly blurred and frequently in poorly executed chinoiserie designs, and overglaze enamels. The bodies fall into two different types, and the glaze formula was also changed at some point, improving it considerably.

== Former Plymouth factory, or Champion's factory ==
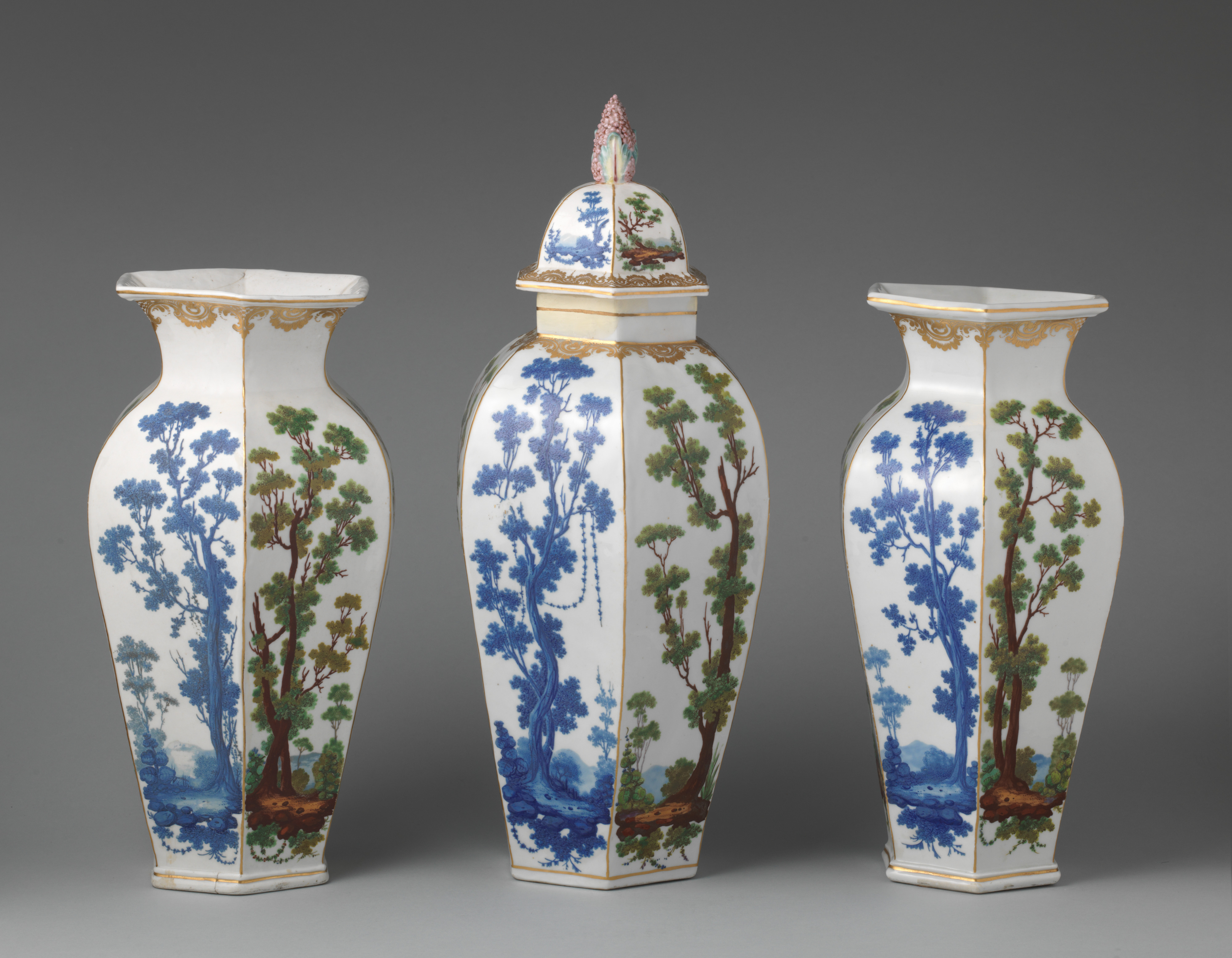
Garniture of three vases, c. 1773, painted by Michel Socquet

Cookworthy's Plymouth factory was removed to Bristol in 1770 and was afterwards transferred to Richard Champion of Bristol, a merchant and shipowner who had been a shareholder from 1768. Champion's Bristol factory lasted from 1774 to 1781, when the business was sold to a number of Staffordshire potters owing to serious losses it had accrued. Bristol porcelain, like that of Plymouth, was a hard-paste porcelain: "It is harder and whiter than the other 18th-century English soft-paste porcelains, and its cold, harsh, glittering glaze marks it off at once from the wares of Bow, Chelsea, Worcester or Derby".

Champion had great hopes for the factory, and succeeded in greatly improving the quality of the porcelain body, as well as maintaining and improving artistic standards. Michel Socquet and the young Henry Bone, later a leading enamel painter on copper, were the two leading painters, and new Neoclassical styles were introduced. Where Cookworthy looked to East Asia porceain for models, Champion preferred Meissen porcelain and French factories. Whilst ornamental wares were made, the staple was tea and coffee services, a number made for local businessmen or for politicians and their wives, including Jane Burke, wife of Edmund Burke, who Champion helped to be elected MP for Bristol in 1774.

But Champion's other business interests ran into difficulty, and the porcelain was not producing immediate profits, so by the autumn of 1778 the firing of new porcelain ended, although there were considerable stocks of undecorated fired wares. These were being decorated and sold until 1782.

The wares of Plymouth and the first years at Bristol are not easily distinguished, and many prefer to classify pieces as "Cookworthy" or "Champion". Factory marks are of only limited help, as many pieces are unmarked, and the main mark was used at both Plymouth and Bristol; this was in underglaze blue, the alchemical symbol for tin, also used for the planet Jupiter. This presumably referred to Cornwall's main mining product. Other marks, such as a "B" with a cross in blue or gold, were only used at Bristol.

Gallery of wares from the Champion period

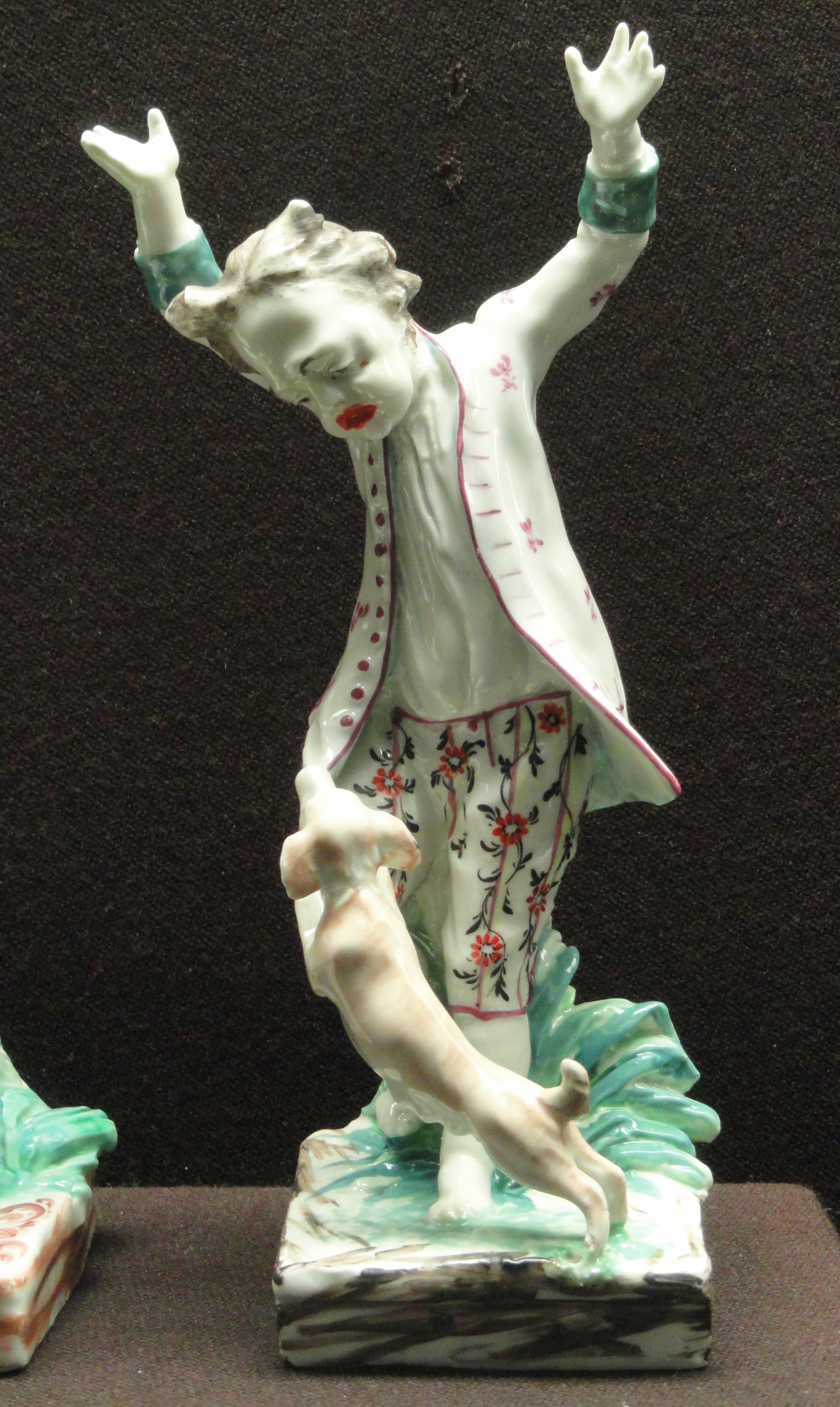
Boy frightened by a Dog, c. 1772–1775

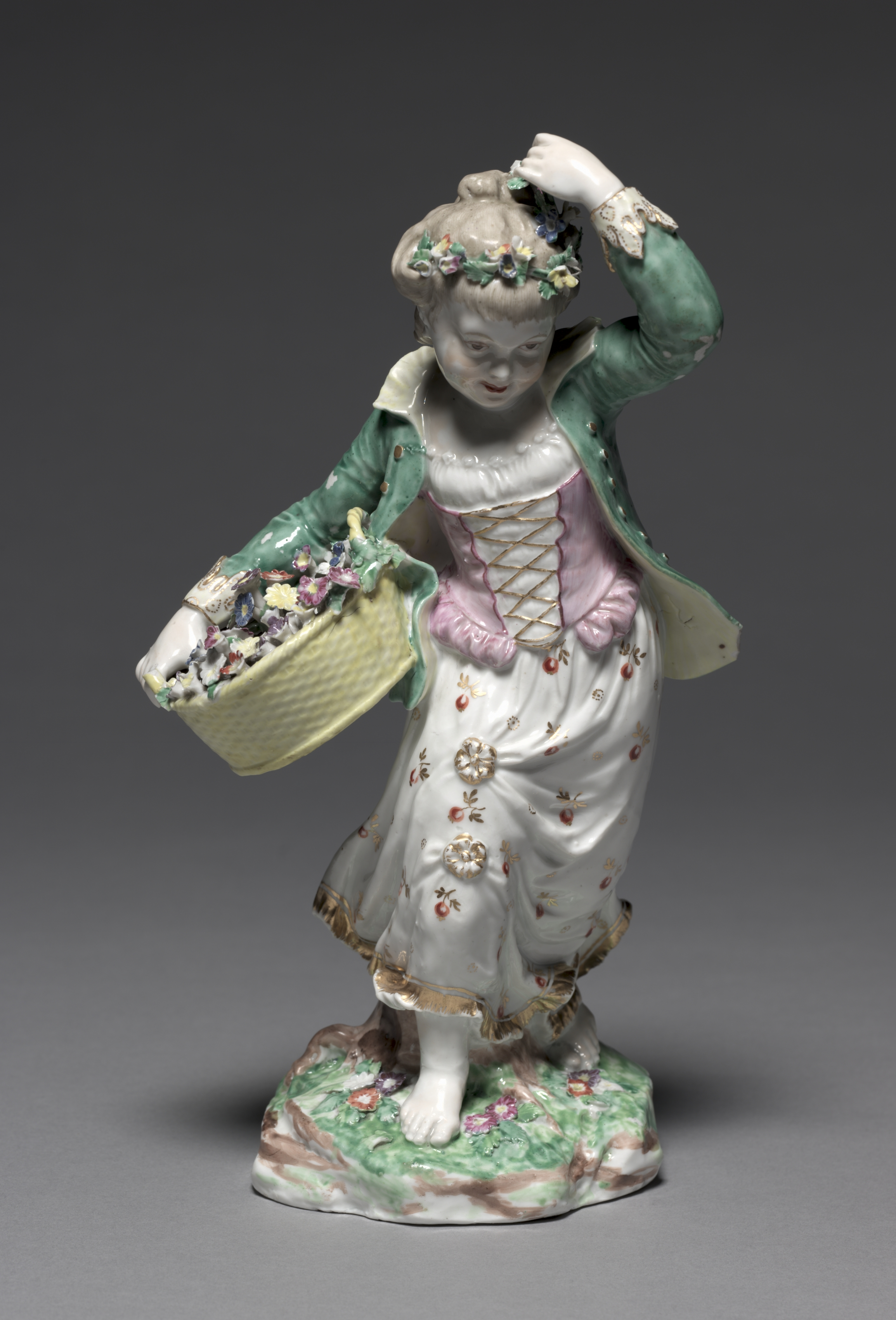
Autumn from a set of the four seasons, 1770s

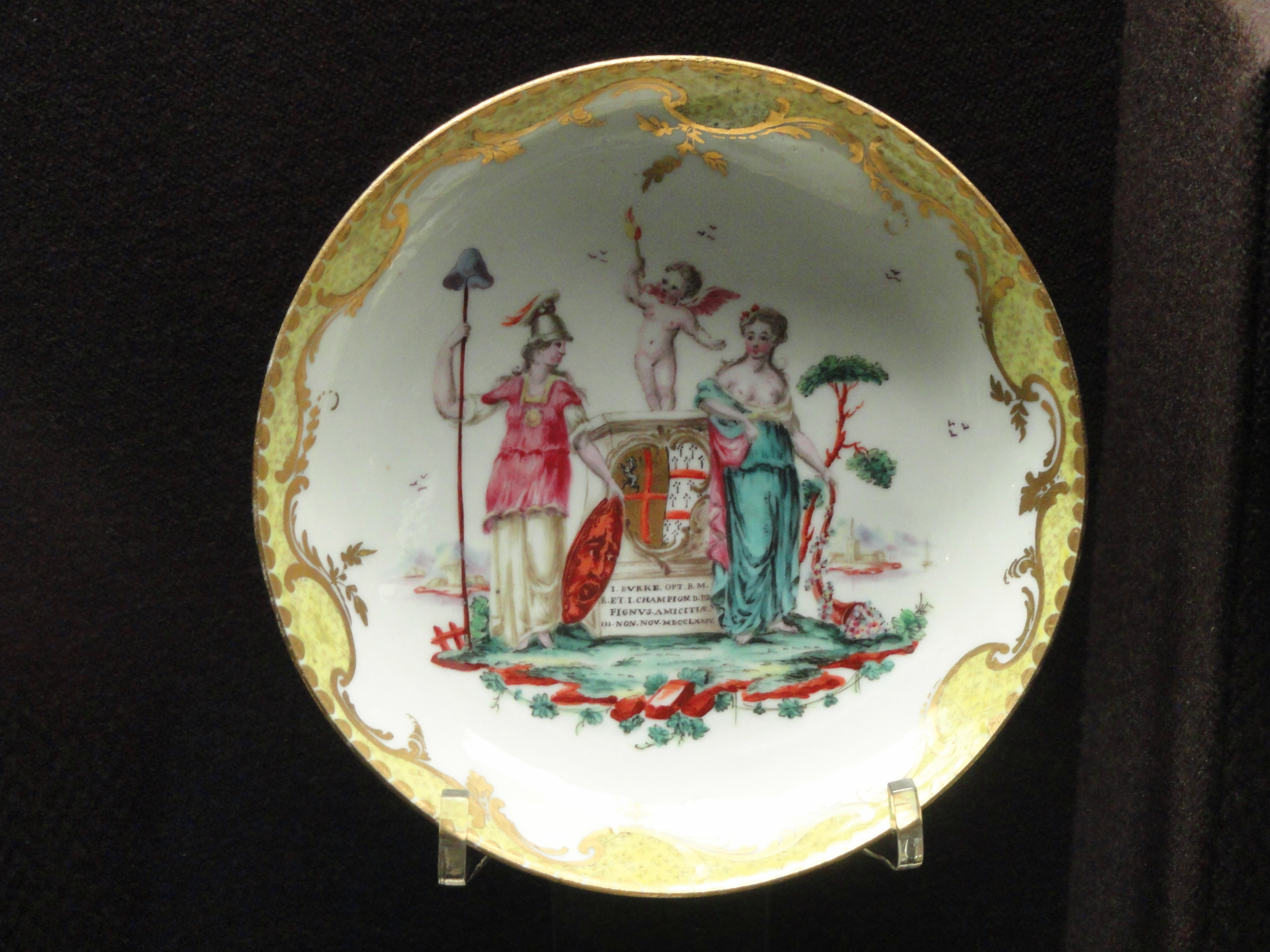
Coffee saucer from the Edmund Burke service, 1774

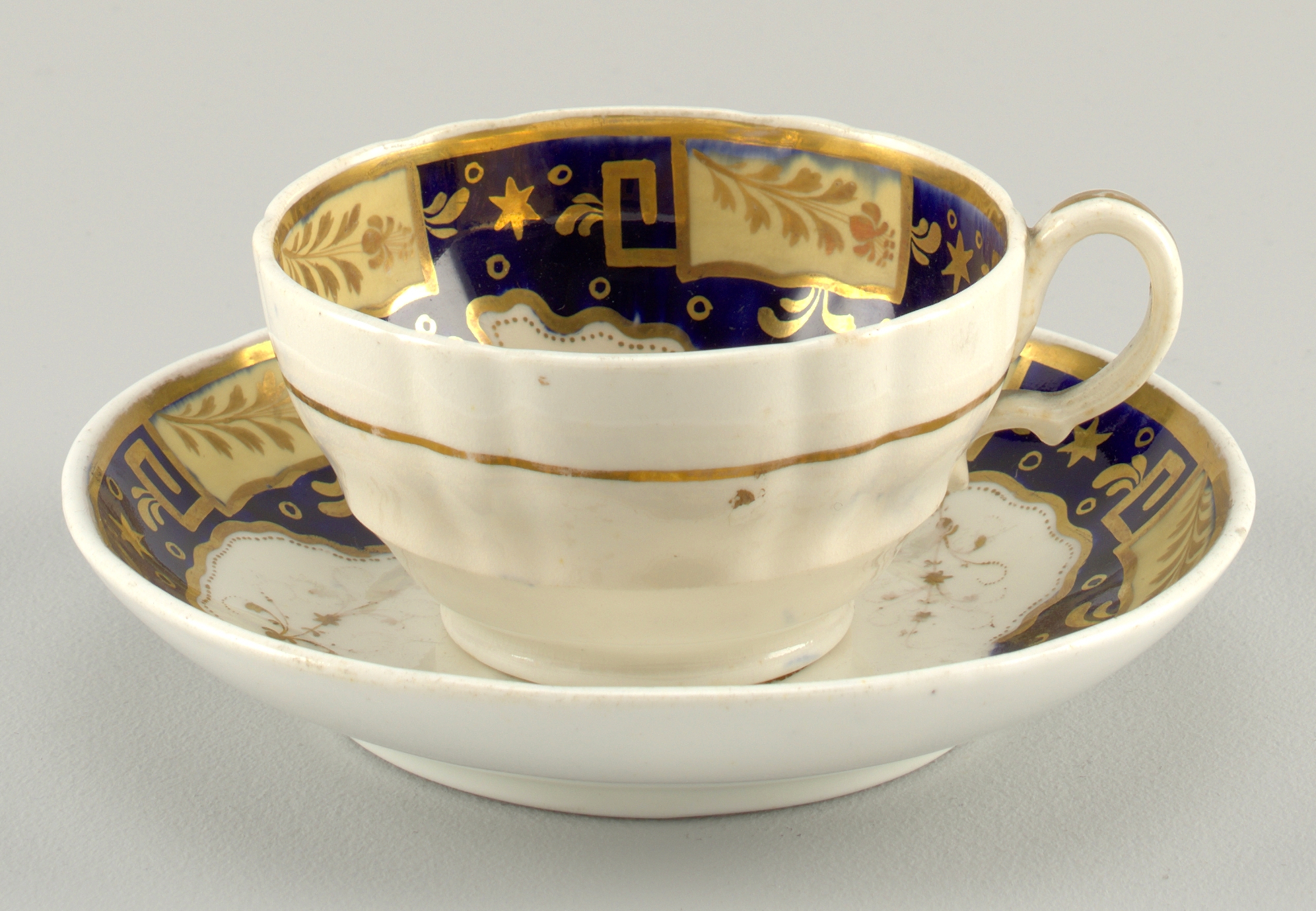
Cup And Saucer, c. 1775

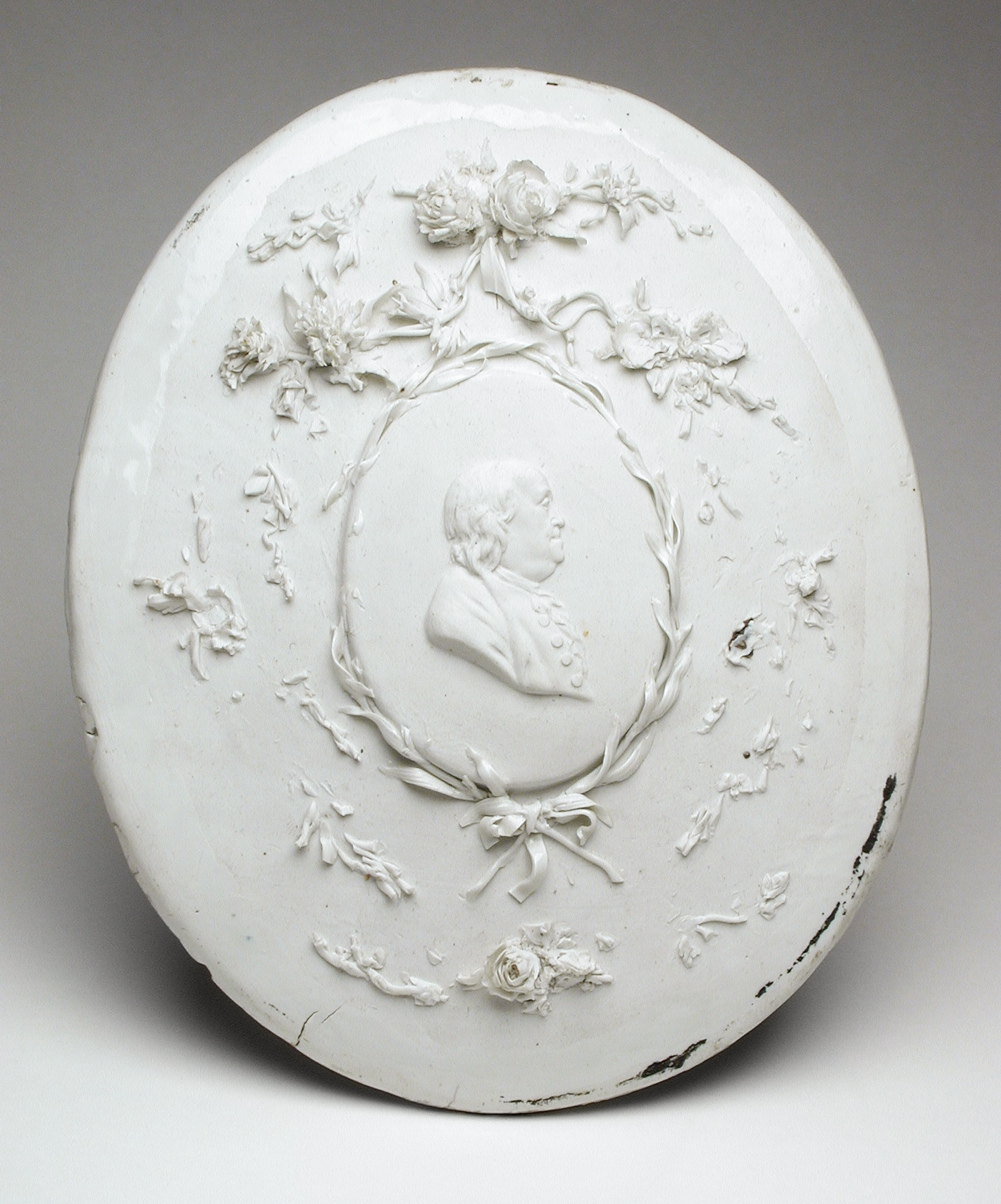
Plaque with Portrait Bust of Benjamin Franklin, biscuit porcelain, c. 1775

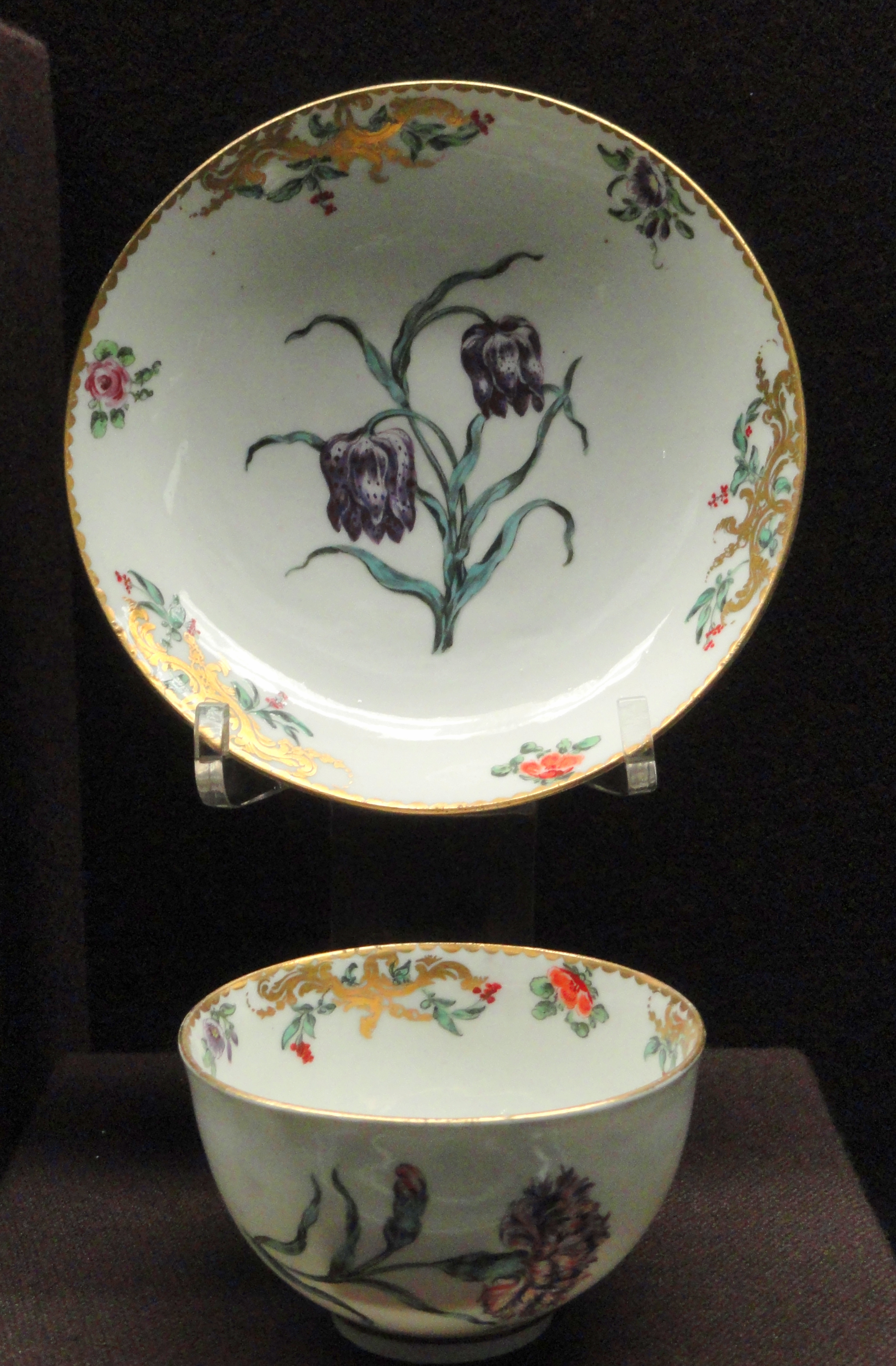
Teabowl and saucer, c. 1775, decoration attributed to Henry Bone

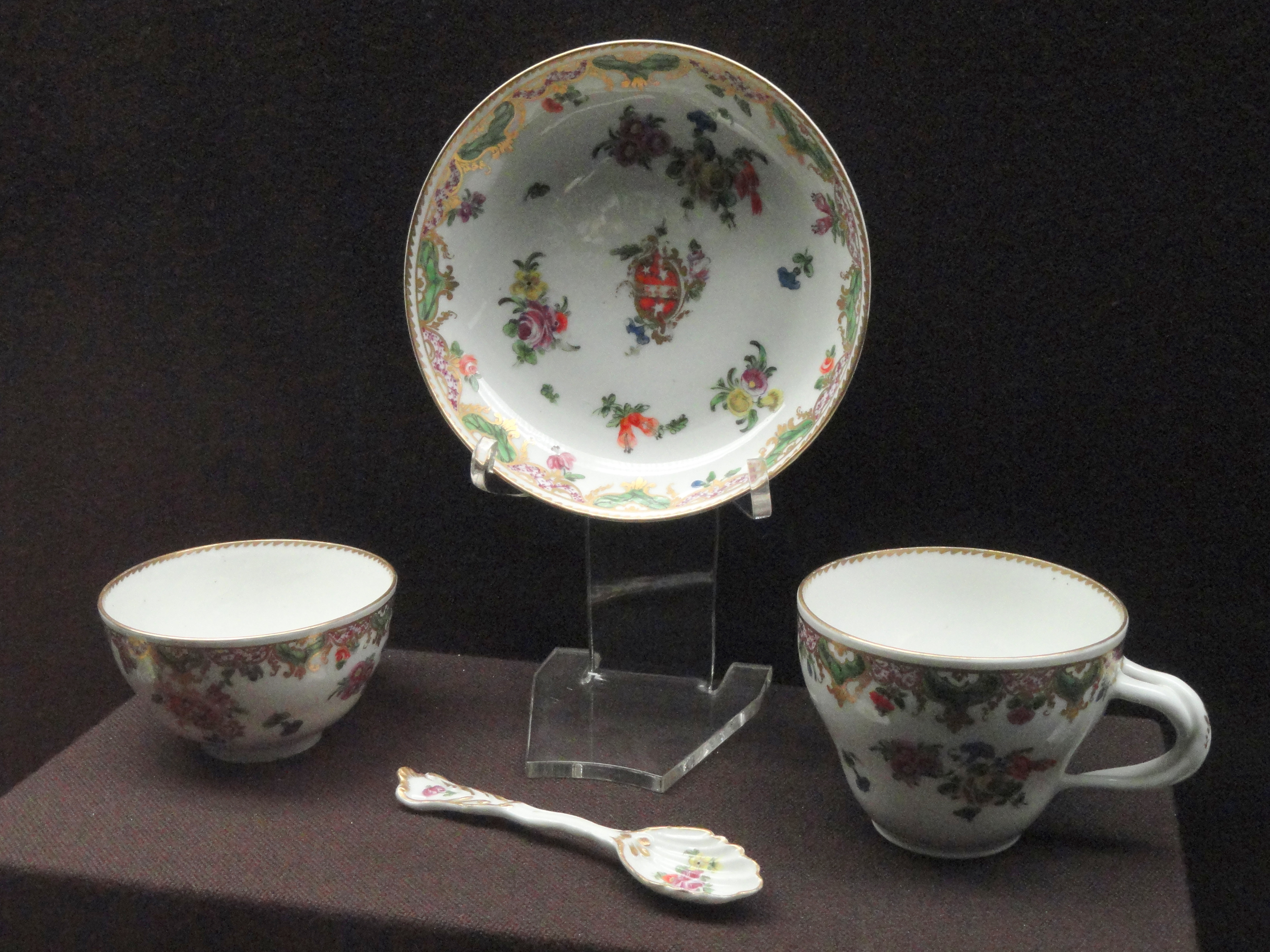
Teacup, coffee cup, spoon and saucer from the Daniel Ludlow service, c. 1775–1778

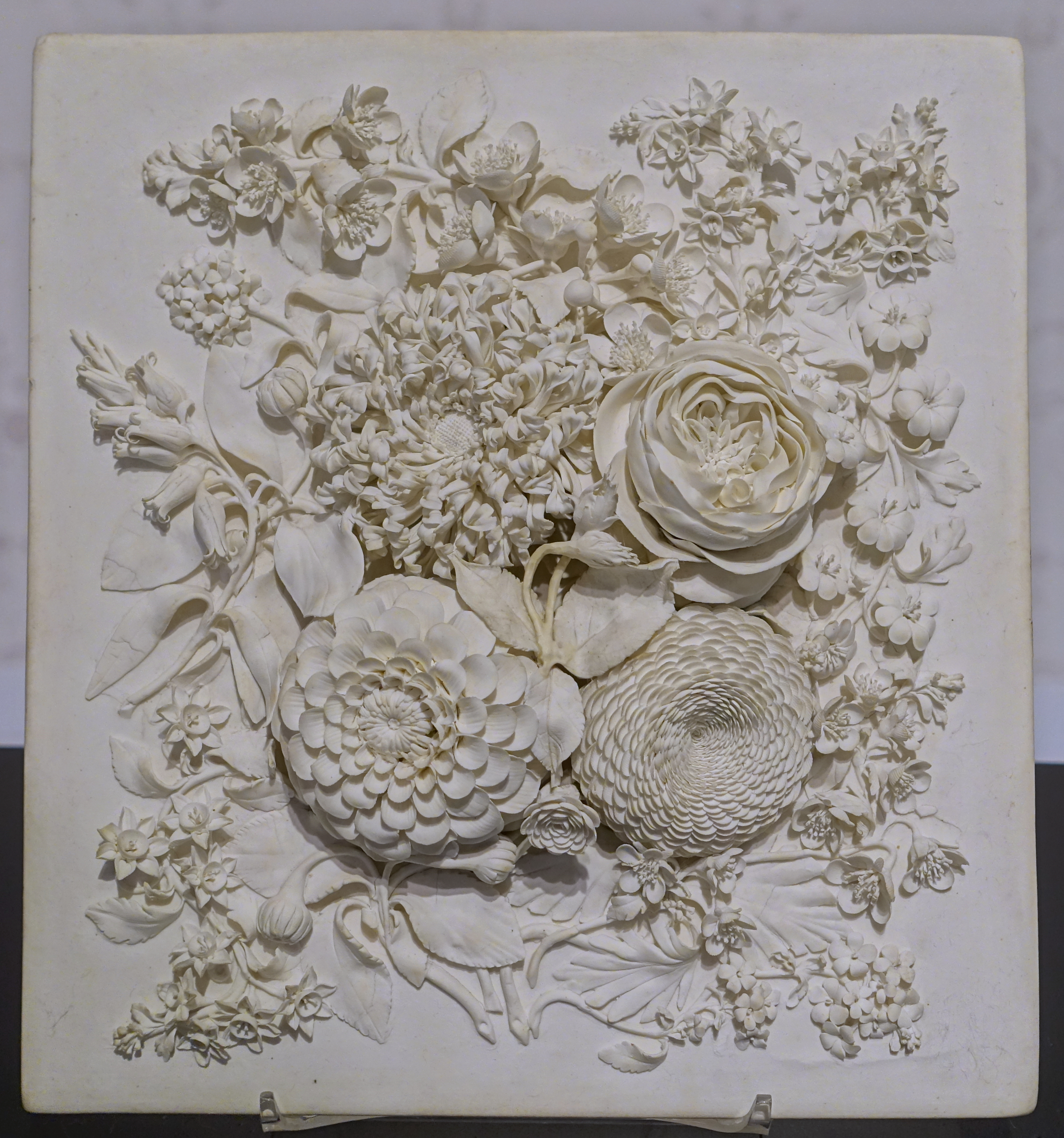
Floral plaque in biscuit porcelain, c. 1776
