= William Cookworthy =

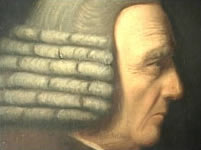
- William Cookworthy
- Born: 12 April 1705; Kingsbridge, Devon, England
- Died: 17 October 1780 (aged 75)
- Spouse: Sarah Berry (m. 1735)
- Children: 5 daughters (Lydia, Sarah, Mary, Elizabeth, Susannah)
- Scientific career
- Fields: Pharmacy, Porcelain manufacture

William Cookworthy (12 April 1705 – 17 October 1780) was an English Quaker minister, a successful pharmacist and an innovator in several fields of technology. He was the first person in Britain to discover how to make hard-paste porcelain, like that imported from China. He subsequently discovered china clay in Cornwall. In 1768 he founded a works at Plymouth for the production of Plymouth porcelain; in 1770 he moved the factory to Bristol, to become Bristol porcelain, before selling it to a partner in 1773. In Kingsbridge there is now a museum named after him which features an exhibition about his life and works.

== Parents, birth, siblings and early life ==
He was born of Quaker parents in Kingsbridge, Devon on 12 April 1705. His father, also called William, was a weaver and his mother was Edith, the daughter of John and Margaret Debell of St Martin-by-Looe in east Cornwall: they had married in 1704. Their children were:

- William – 1705
- Sarah – 1706
- Jacob – 1709
- Susannah – 1711
- Mary – 1714
- Philip – 1716
- Benjamin – 1717

William was a bright child but his education was halted when his father died on 22 October 1718 and the family's investment in the South Sea Company failed in the autumn of 1720.

William had been offered an apprenticeship, at no cost, by the Bevan Brothers, two Quaker apothecaries, with a successful business in London. As the family had no spare money, William walked to London to take up the offer and, eventually, completed the apprenticeship. He was taken into partnership.

== Plymouth ==
He moved to Plymouth, where he set up a pharmacy as Bevan and Cookworthy. This flourished. He eventually brought his brothers Philip and Benjamin into the partnership and bought out the Bevans' interest in 1745. He became prominent among Devon Quakers, being appointed as an Elder. Among his concerns was that Quakers should not tolerate their members trading in prize goods (ships and their cargoes seized in war), as Quakers should not benefit from war. However the Navy's Sick and Hurt Board, November 1, 1771, writes to Messers Cookworthy, Druggists requesting they supply Mr Thompson, Surgeon to the Marines at Plymouth's order. Whilst December 24, 1772 the Sick and Hurt Board were written to by Mr Raggett, Dispenser at Plymouth Hospital requesting a supply of medicines and necessaries which Cookworthy was ordered to supply, except those which were already in Raggett's stores.

The manufacture of porcelain was at the time attracting great attention in England, and while the factories at Bow, Chelsea, Worcester and Derby were introducing the artificial glassy porcelain, Cookworthy, following the accounts from China of the Jesuit priest Père d'Entrecolles, spent many years in searching for English materials similar to those used in China. From 1745 onwards he seems to have travelled over the greater portion of Cornwall and Devon in search of these minerals, and he finally located them in the parish of St Stephen's near St Austell. With a certain amount of financial assistance from Thomas Pitt (afterwards 1st Baron Camelford) he established the Plymouth China Factory at least as early as 1768.

In Plymouth, records suggest that Cookworthy did not take any apprentices, but he did employ a young Henry Bone, who after the factory was moved to Bristol about 1770, was apprenticed to Richard Champion who with others became the owner of what became the Bristol Porcelain Manufactory. Although the Plymouth porcelain was not of high quality, Cookworthy is remembered for his discovery of those abundant supplies of English clay and rocks which later formed the foundation of English Bone China.

== Marriage ==
In 1735, he married Sarah Berry, a Quaker from Wellington in Somerset. They had five daughters:

- Lydia – 1736
- Sarah – 1738
- Mary – 1740
- Elizabeth & Susannah (twins) – 1743

== Lighthouse engineering ==
He was also an associate of John Smeaton, who lodged at his house when he was engaged in building the third Eddystone Lighthouse (1756–59). Cookworthy helped Smeaton with the development of hydraulic lime, which was essential to the successful building of the lighthouse.

== Swedenborg ==
In 1767 Cookworthy, in conjunction with Rev Thomas Hartley, translated Emanuel Swedenborg's theological works, The Doctrine of Life, Treatise on Influx, and Heaven and Hell, from Latin into English.

His initial reaction to Swedenborg's works was one of disgust, but with persistence, he was convinced of their merits and was a persuasive advocate. Hartley and Cookworthy later visited Swedenborg at his lodgings in Clerkenwell shortly before Swedenborg's death.

=== Friends ===
It is also known that prior to his departure, Captain James Cook, Captain John Jervis, and the naturalists Dr Solander and Sir Joseph Banks, were guests of Cookworthy. He also visited Daniel Gumb, the "Mountain Philosopher" who lived amongst the rocks at Cheesewring.

== Bibliography ==
- Early New Church Worthies by the Rev Dr Jonathon Bayley
- Cookworthy's Plymouth and Bristol Porcelain by F.Severne Mackenna(1947) published by F.Lewis
- William Cookworthy 1705–1780: a study of the pioneer of true porcelain manufacture in England by John Penderill-Church, Truro, Bradford Barton (1972).
