= Richard Champion of Bristol =

English merchant and porcelain manufacturer

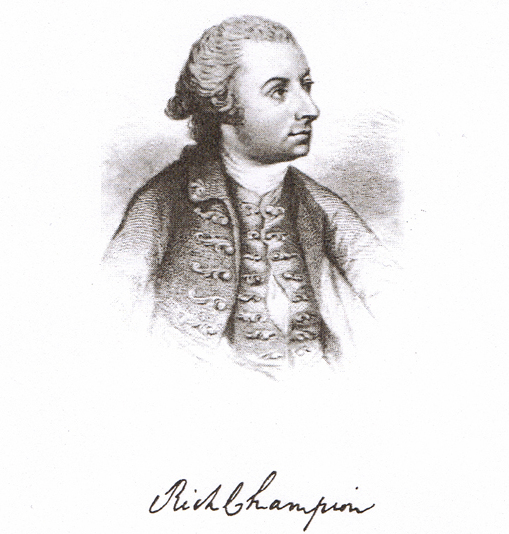
Richard Champion illustrated in Hugh Owen's 200 years of Ceramic Art in Bristol (1873)

Richard Champion (1743–1791) was an English merchant and porcelain manufacturer, who emigrated to the United States in 1784.

== Early life ==
Champion was born into a Quaker merchant family from the Bristol area in England, the son of Joseph Champion (1714–1794), a merchant, and his wife Elizabeth Rogers (d. 1745), daughter of the merchant Francis Rogers. Sarah Fox (1745–1811) the diarist, who married the banker Charles Fox of Plymouth, was his sister. His relations Nehemiah and William and their predecessors were involved in the manufacture of brass for several generations, initially in partnership with Abraham Darby.

== Merchant ==
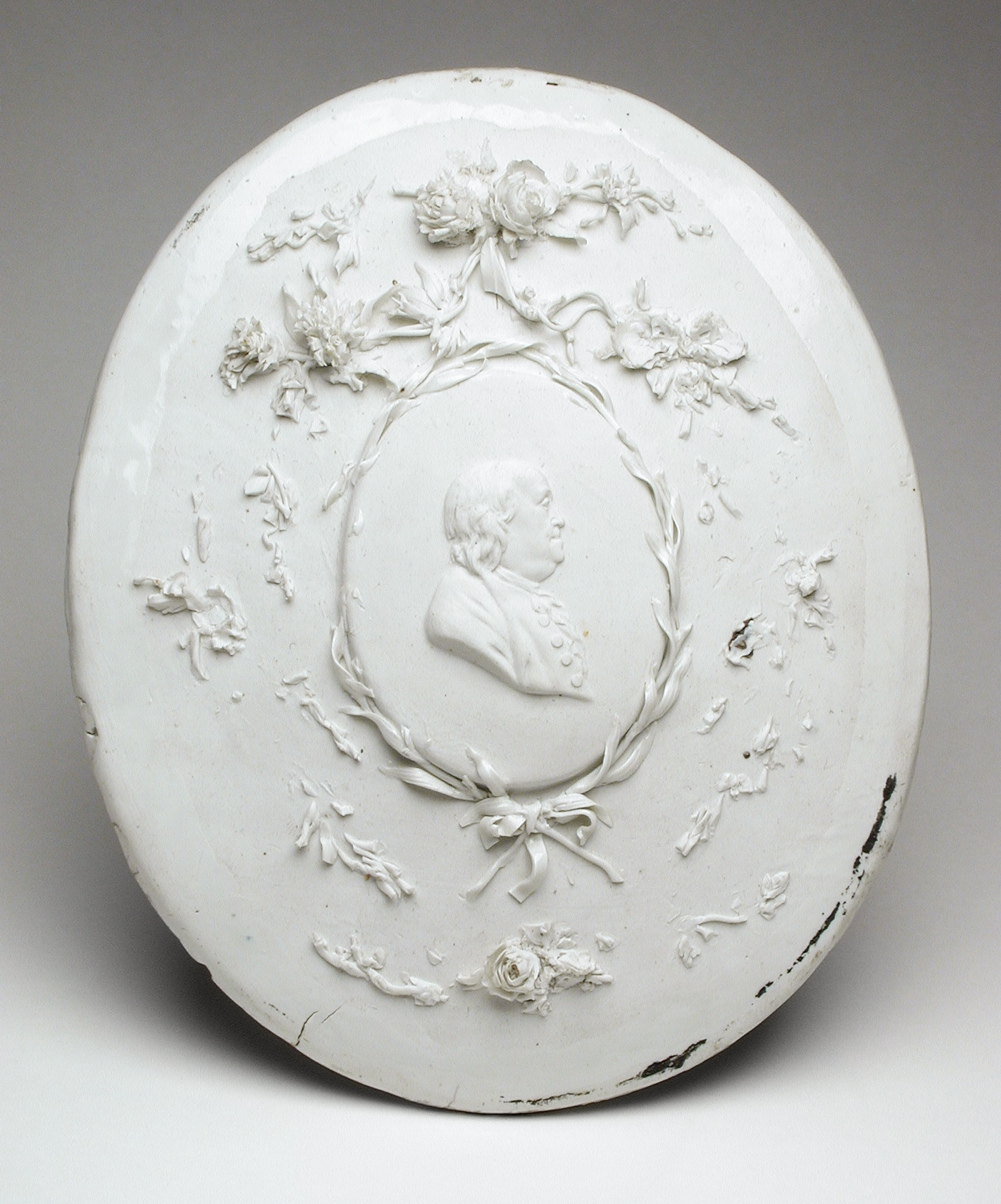
Bristol porcelain plaque with portrait bust of Benjamin Franklin, from Champion's factory, 1770s

After the death of his mother, Champion moved with his father, Joseph, to London where he received his education. Returning to Bristol around 1762 he worked for another uncle, Richard "Gospel" Champion who was a merchant in the city selling goods to the Caribbean and America. In this post, Richard formed relationships with traders on the east coast of America, and encountered the attitude of colonial Americans to the British government.

In 1766, Champion inherited some funds from his uncle and set up as a merchant in his own right. In 1767, he was admitted to the Society of Merchant Venturers in Bristol, and began to campaign on behalf of those involved in the American trade.

Champion's activities as a merchant involved forming relationships with prominent American counterparts, including Robert Morris of Philadelphia. Champion imported wheat from Morris and sold it in England. Another was Henry Laurens of South Carolina, a prominent politician in the State. He also cultivated other important figures, writing to Benjamin Franklin and to George Washington.

Champion became treasurer of the Bristol Royal Infirmary at the age of 22, following other family members in the same role. He participated in charitable activities all of his life, though his Quaker beliefs were sometimes tested.

== Manufacturer and politician ==
Champion met William Cookworthy around 1764; and when Cookworthy, the founder of the Plymouth Porcelain Manufactory, moved this business in 1770, it was to Champion he turned as manager, with Champion taking shares. The wares were, uniquely in England, of a hard paste recipe, made from materials discovered by Cookworthy and owned by Thomas Pitt. Champion was a Whig, and his role in getting Edmund Burke elected as MP for Bristol in 1774 led to a friendship with Burke and to further active involvement in Whig politics. In the same year, 1774, Champion bought out Cookworthy and became the owner of the Bristol porcelain manufactory.

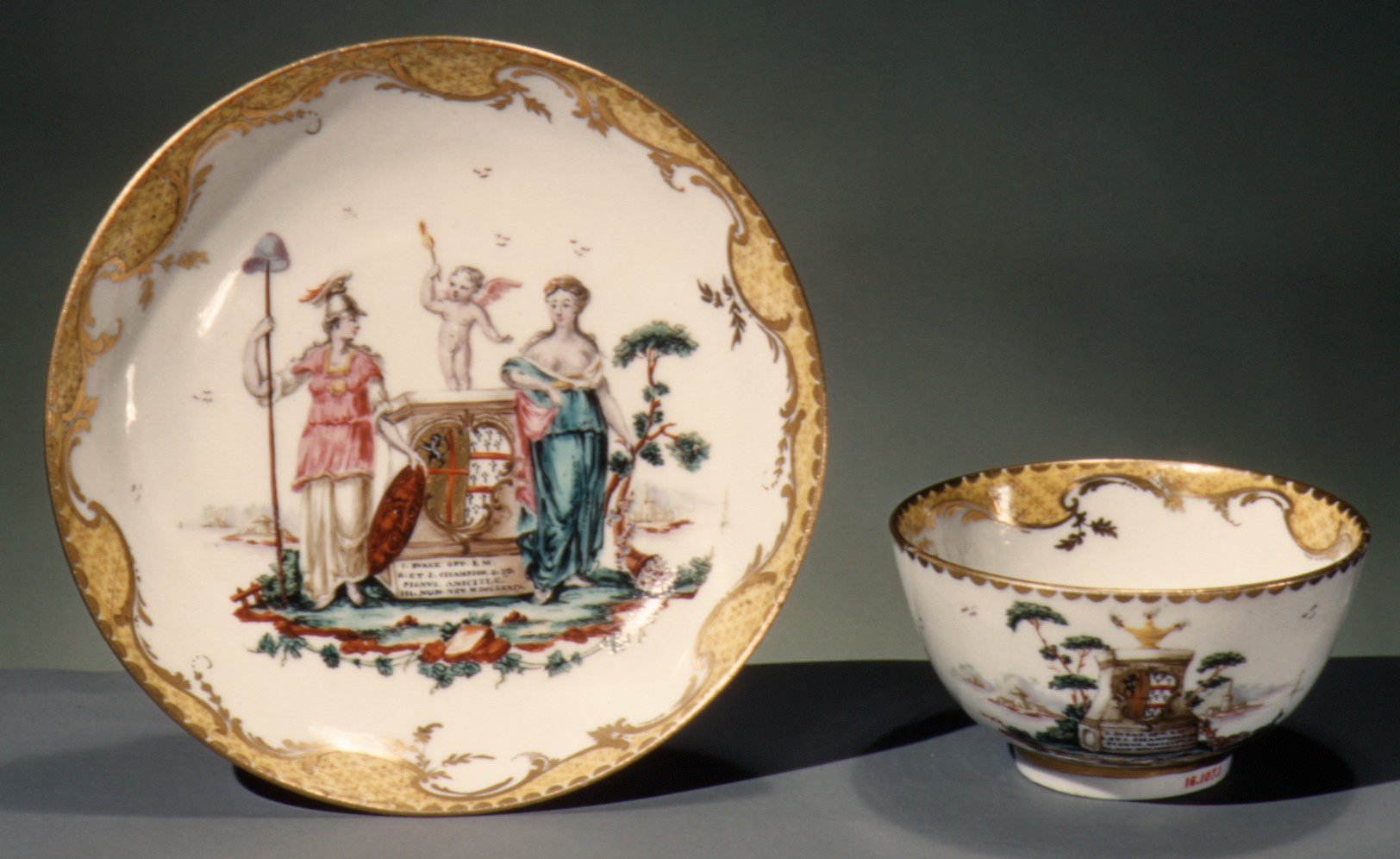
Bristol porcelain cup and saucer, 1774, from the Champion period. The Latin inscription reads: "R. and J. Champion gave this as a token of friendship to J. Burke the best of British wives, on the third day of November, 1774". This was Jane, Mrs Edmund Burke; Champion was a friend, who helped Burke's election that year as a Bristol MP.

Champion was instrumental from around 1772 in changing the outdated rococo wares made by the factory to the neoclassical style. They could match and at times exceed Derby porcelain for quality, and emulate Sèvres and Meissen, on which some of the wares were based. Whilst ornamental wares were made, the staple was tea and coffee services, a number made for local businessmen or for politicians and their wives, including Jane Burke, wife of Edmund Burke, who Champion helped to be elected MP for Bristol in 1774.

Porcelain Patent Act 1775
- Act of Parliament
- Parliament of Great Britain
- Long title: An Act for enlarging the Term of Letters Patent granted by His present Majesty to William Cookworthy, of Plymouth, Chymist, for the sole Use and Exercise of a Discovery of certain Materials for making Porcelain, in order to enable Richard Champion, of Bristol, Merchant, (to whom the said Letters Patent have been assigned), to carry the said Discovery into effectual Execution for the Benefit of the Publick.
- Citation: 15 Geo. 3. c. 52
- Territorial extent: Great Britain

Dates
- Royal assent: 26 May 1775
- Commencement: 29 November 1774 (Note: Start of session.)
- Repealed: 2 May 1986
Other legislation
Repealed by	Statute Law (Repeals) Act 1986

Status: Repealed

Text of statute as originally enacted

In 1775 Champion embarked on an ill-fated attempt to extend Cookworthy's patent, which still had seven years to run. Concerted opposition by Josiah Wedgwood and other potters led to a narrower specification in the resulting Porcelain Patent Act 1775 (15 Geo. 3. c. 52), which allowed any potter who slightly changed the composition of the wares to manufacture. The American Revolution resulted in legislation to ban all shipments to America, the heart of Champion's merchanting trade. Champion supported the grievances and plight of colonial Americans and urged better relations between Britain and America. Early in 1778, in the midst of financial difficulties, he took part in a meeting in Bristol to raise funds for American prisoners of war, subscribing 5 guineas personally.

Champion resorted to desperate measures to stay afloat. His shipments to America continued via Amsterdam, including one designed to place funds in America should it be necessary for Champion to call on them. In 1778 Champion also became ensnared with American spies in a prominent American Revolutionary scandal, the Silas Deane affair. In August of that year his financial position became untenable, and he handed assets to administrators voluntarily to avoid debtors' prison. Shortly after this it appears that Champion was disunited from the Quakers. One positive effect of the administration arrangements was that by avoiding bankruptcy Champions apprentices were able to achieve an orderly end to their apprenticeships. Notably, the most talented of these, Henry Bone, commenced his remarkable career in London as a portrait enameler. In 1779 Champion probably re-purchased the Bristol porcelain factory with the help of friends, and he set about selling off the stock, the final act being the Christie's auction in February 1780.

Champion went to Staffordshire in 1781 with the hope of selling the patent without much success, though an agreement was signed with ten local potteries. The patent required that materials were purchased through the Cookworthy estate, with 100 percent mark up.

In 1783 Champion was appointed as Deputy Paymaster to the Forces, a role offered to him by the Paymaster, Edmund Burke. This role was short lived because of a change in administration, but a second change resulted in the same team being re-appointed in 1784. The re-appointment was embroiled in controversy for Burke since two accountants in his office had been indicted for fraud. One committed suicide and both Champion and Burke had provided character references for the second, Charles Bembridge, who was then sent for trial and convicted. It emerged that Champion, who was about to emigrate to America, had borrowed money from Bembridge and this embarrassment ended his friendship with Burke.

== In the United States ==
Champion left England in October 1784 and arrived in Charleston, South Carolina. With land probably provided for him by his brother-in-law, John Lloyd, he set up a plantation about 100 miles north at Camden, handing over its running to his two sons. Lloyd, by then President of the South Carolina Assembly, may have helped again in 1787 when Champion obtained American citizenship.

Champion became Clerk of the Court, then a Justice, and in 1790 served as a delegate for his region in the drawing up of a new Constitution for the State. Failing to access the funds he had sent to America because of disputes over its ownership, Champion remained short of funds throughout his remaining life. In 1790 his wife Julia died and Champion was to follow her in 1791 at the age of 48.

== Works ==
Champion was the author of political pamphlets. The first was Considerations on the present situation of Great Britain and the United States of North America with a view of their future Commercial Connexions, published anonymously in 1784 shortly before Champion emigrated, and later with his name appended. The next, Comparative reflections on the past and present political, commercial, and civil state of Great Britain; with some thoughts concerning emigration, was published in 1787.

== Family ==
Champion married Judith Lloyd (1741–1790), also known as Julia, in 1764. They had nine children. Of those, seven survived him, most of whom returned to England. Son Richard Lloyd Champion (1771–1813) who had made a success in business and inherited the estate of his uncle John Lloyd remained in America as did his brother John Lloyd Champion who died in 1793.
