= Plymouth porcelain =

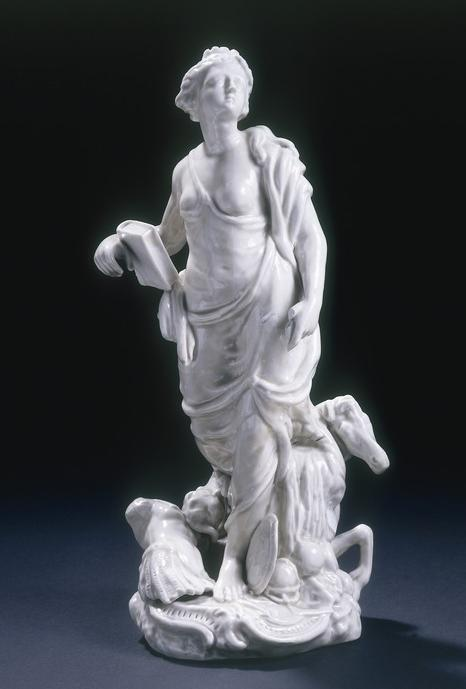
"Europe", about 1770, from a set. Height 32.7 cm, V&A Museum.

Plymouth porcelain was the first English hard paste porcelain, made in the county of Devon from 1768 to 1770. After two years in Plymouth the factory moved to Bristol in 1770, where it operated until 1781, when it was sold and moved to Staffordshire as the nucleus of New Hall porcelain, which operated until 1835. The Plymouth factory was founded by William Cookworthy. The porcelain factories at Plymouth and Bristol were among the earliest English manufacturers of porcelain, and the first to produce the hard-paste porcelain produced in China and the German factories led by Meissen porcelain.

The term Bristol porcelain can refer either to this, the Cookworthy factory, or to "Lund's Bristol" or "Lund & Miller", an entirely different porcelain factory that made soft-paste porcelain in Bristol from 1750 until 1752, when it merged with the young Worcester porcelain (see there for more information), and moved there.

The Plymouth factory was removed to Bristol in 1770 and was afterwards transferred to Richard Champion of Bristol, a merchant who had been a shareholder from 1768. Champion's Bristol factory lasted from 1774 to 1781, when the business was sold to a number of Staffordshire potters owing to serious losses it had accrued. Bristol porcelain, like that of Plymouth, was a hard-paste porcelain. It is harder and whiter than the other 18th-century English soft-paste porcelains, and its cold, harsh, glittering glaze marks it off at once from the wares of Bow, Chelsea, Worcester or Derby.

The Plymouth pieces show technical teething troubles. There are various technical faults with many pieces, and according to legend Cookworthy painted one early mug himself, and another piece was chipped in manufacture but still thought worth painting. Some pieces use Longton Hall models; possibly Cookworthy bought the moulds in London. The modellers are unclear, though some figures are very fine, including the set of the continents ("Europe" illustrated). One modeller seems also to have worked at Derby.

== History ==
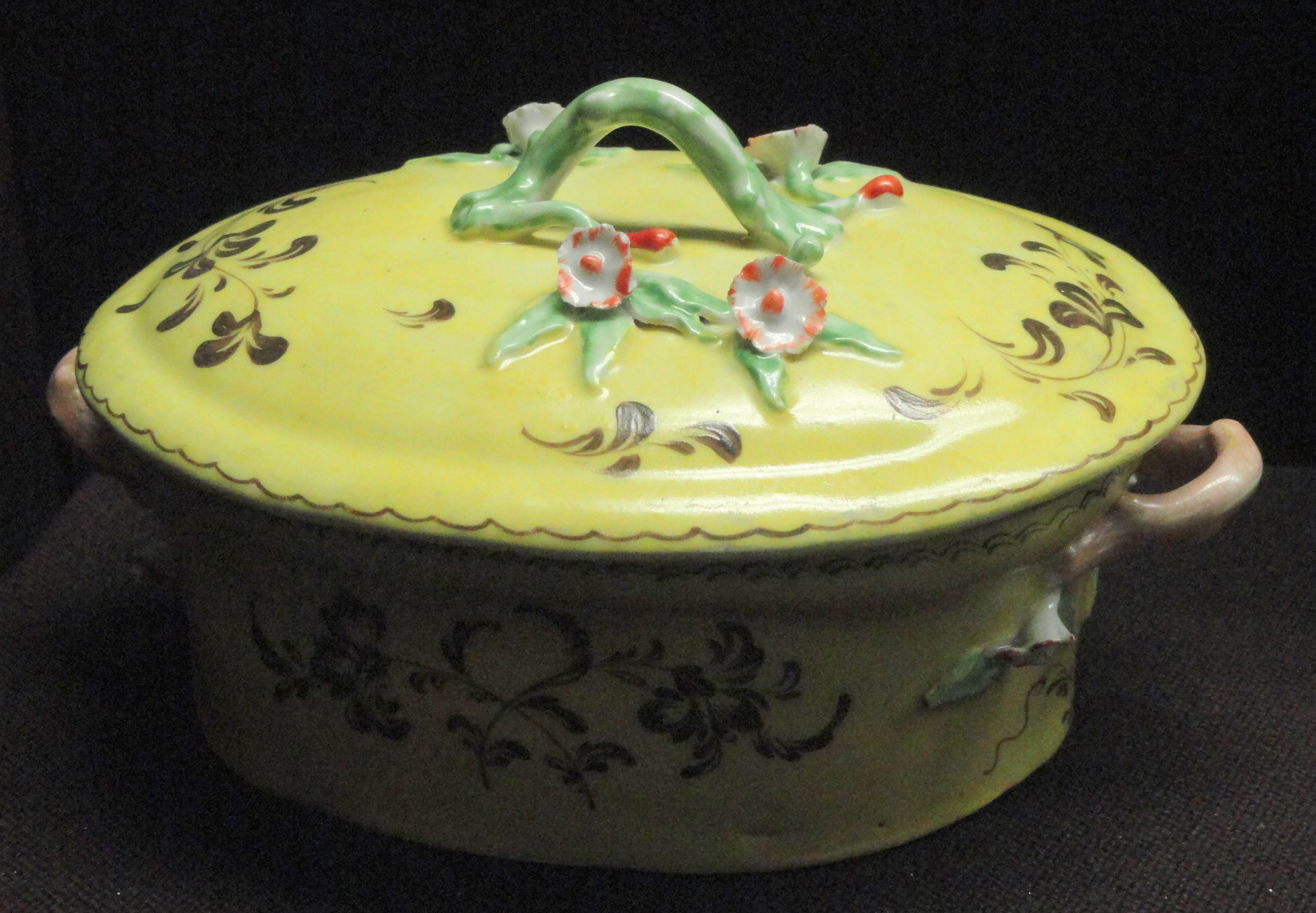
Covered butter pot, c. 1770, William Cookworthy & Co., Bristol (or possibly Plymouth), England, hard-paste porcelain, overglaze enamels

William Cookworthy, a Quaker Pharmacist of Plymouth, was greatly interested in locating in Cornwall and Devon minerals similar to those described by Père François Xavier d'Entrecolles, a Jesuit missionary who worked in China during the early eighteenth century, as forming the basis of Chinese porcelain. Père d'Entrecolles provided an account in two letters, the first written in 1712 and the second written in 1722, of porcelain manufacture at the town of Jingdezhen that included a detailed description of the two principal materials used to make porcelain, china clay and Chinese pottery stone. After many years of travel and research William Cookworthy determined that Cornish china stone could be made to serve as equivalents to the Chinese materials and in 1768 he founded a works at Plymouth for the production of a porcelain similar to the Chinese from these native materials.

In 1768 Cookworthy took out a patent for the exploitation of these Cornish materials in the manufacture of porcelain. The company began with 14 shares of £15 or £20 each, three held by Cookworthy, and the others one each by a group of his relatives and "prominent Bristol men", including Richard Champion of Bristol. More capital was needed later, and the company seems to have been loss-making. Thomas Pitt, 1st Baron Camelford, who owned the Cornish lands where the materials were sourced, took an interest in the company, whose success was naturally in his interest.

The wares of Plymouth and the first years at Bristol are not easily distinguished, and many prefer to classify pieces as "Cookworthy" or "Champion".

== Bristol ==
The factory was removed to Bristol in 1770 and was afterwards transferred to Richard Champion, a merchant already a shareholder. The patent was sold to Champion in 1773. An application to extend it was opposed by Wedgwood and other pottery companies, and mostly refused, so it expired in 1782 at the end of the original term, though Champion was granted rights for 14 years for the use of Cornish materials to make translucent porcelain. In the end he sold his rights in 1781 to the Staffordshire company that started New Hall porcelain in 1782, including New Hall.

In the end the English invention of bone china was to prove the most satisfactory material, and the great majority of English porcelain had moved to that by 1820.

== Marks ==
Factory marks are of only limited help, as many pieces are unmarked, and the main mark was also used at Bristol; this was in underglaze blue, the alchemical symbol for tin, also used for the planet Jupiter. This presumably referred to Cornwall's main mining product. Other marks, such as a "B", were only used at Bristol.

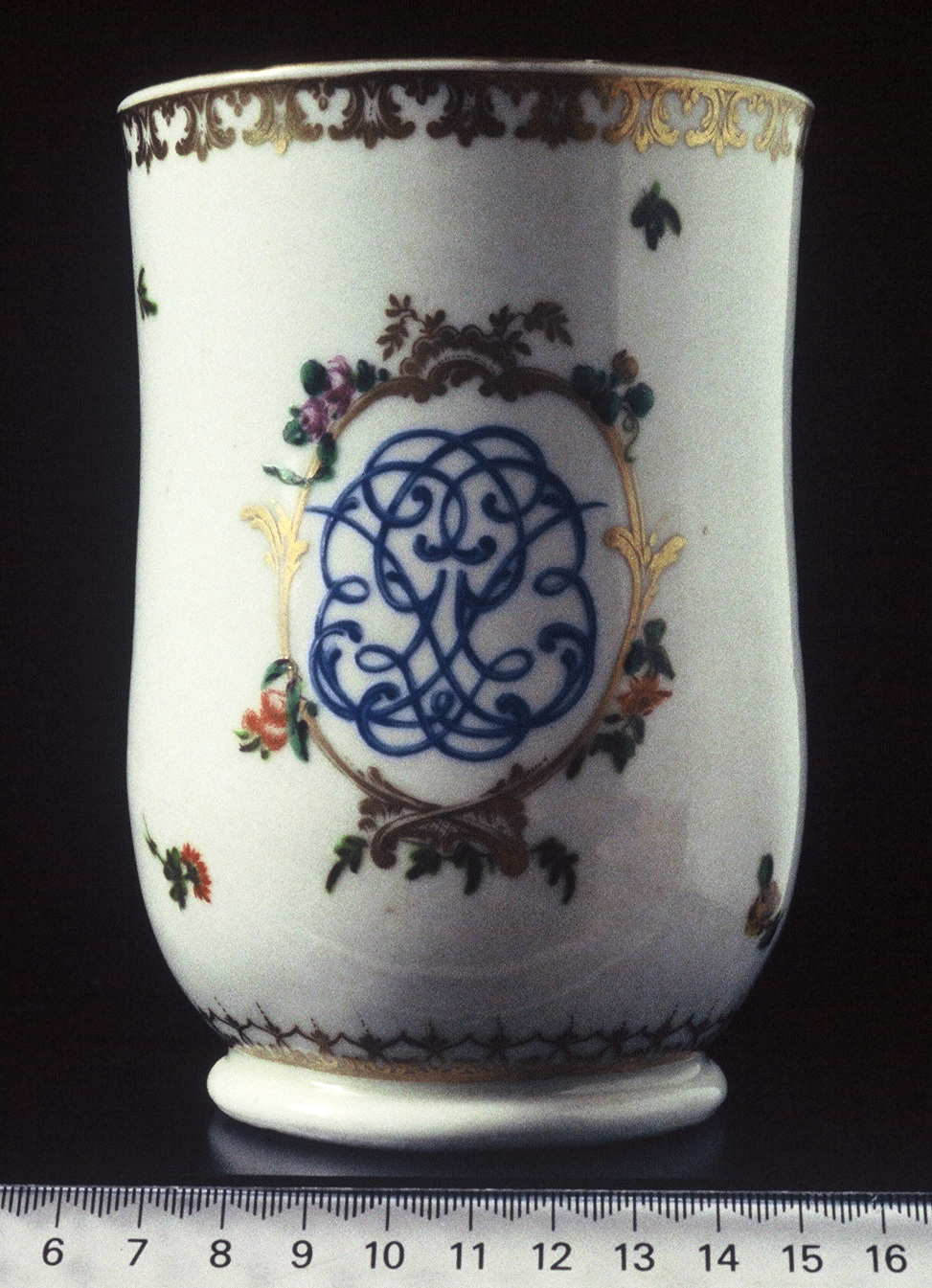
Armorial mug, Plymouth

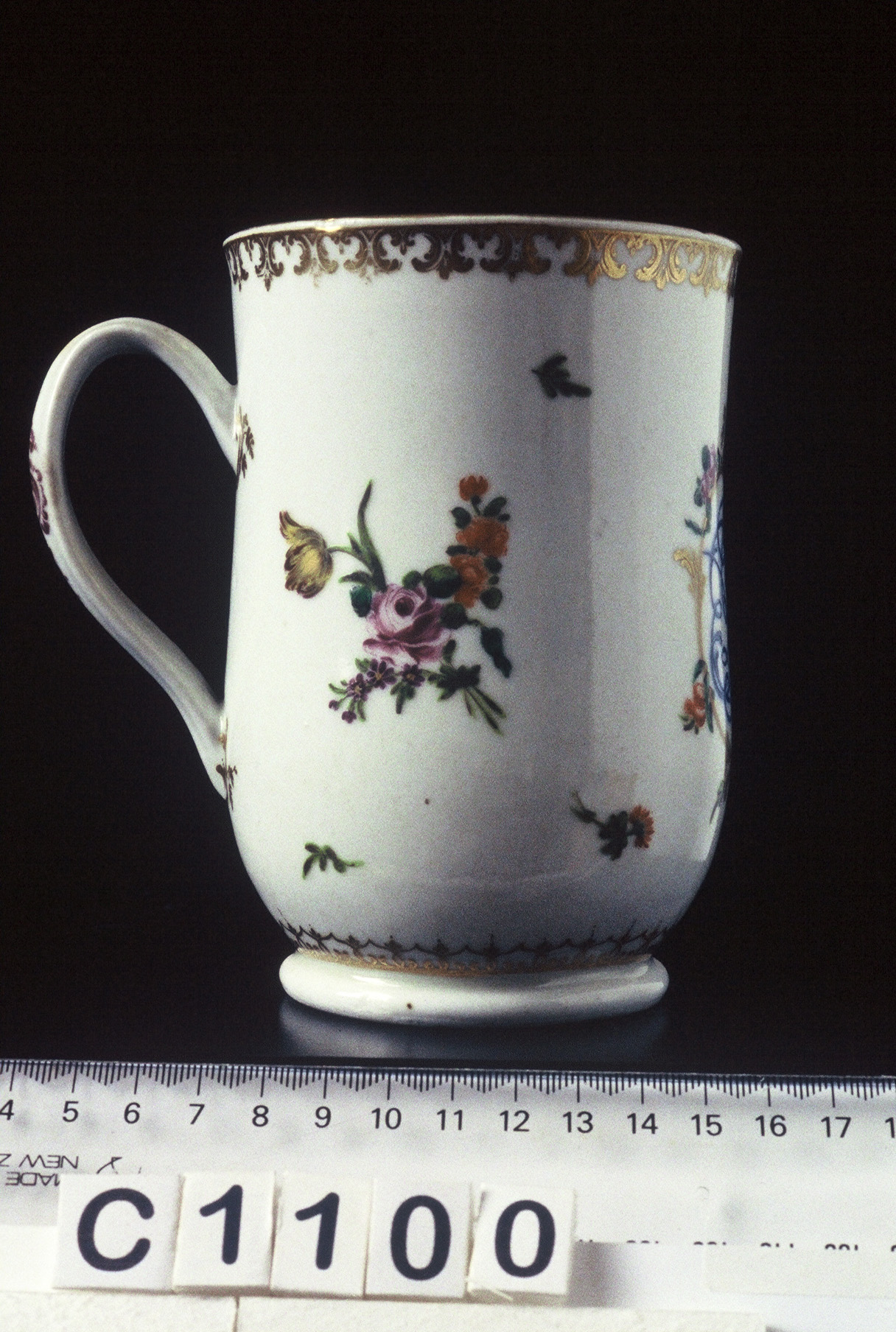
Another view

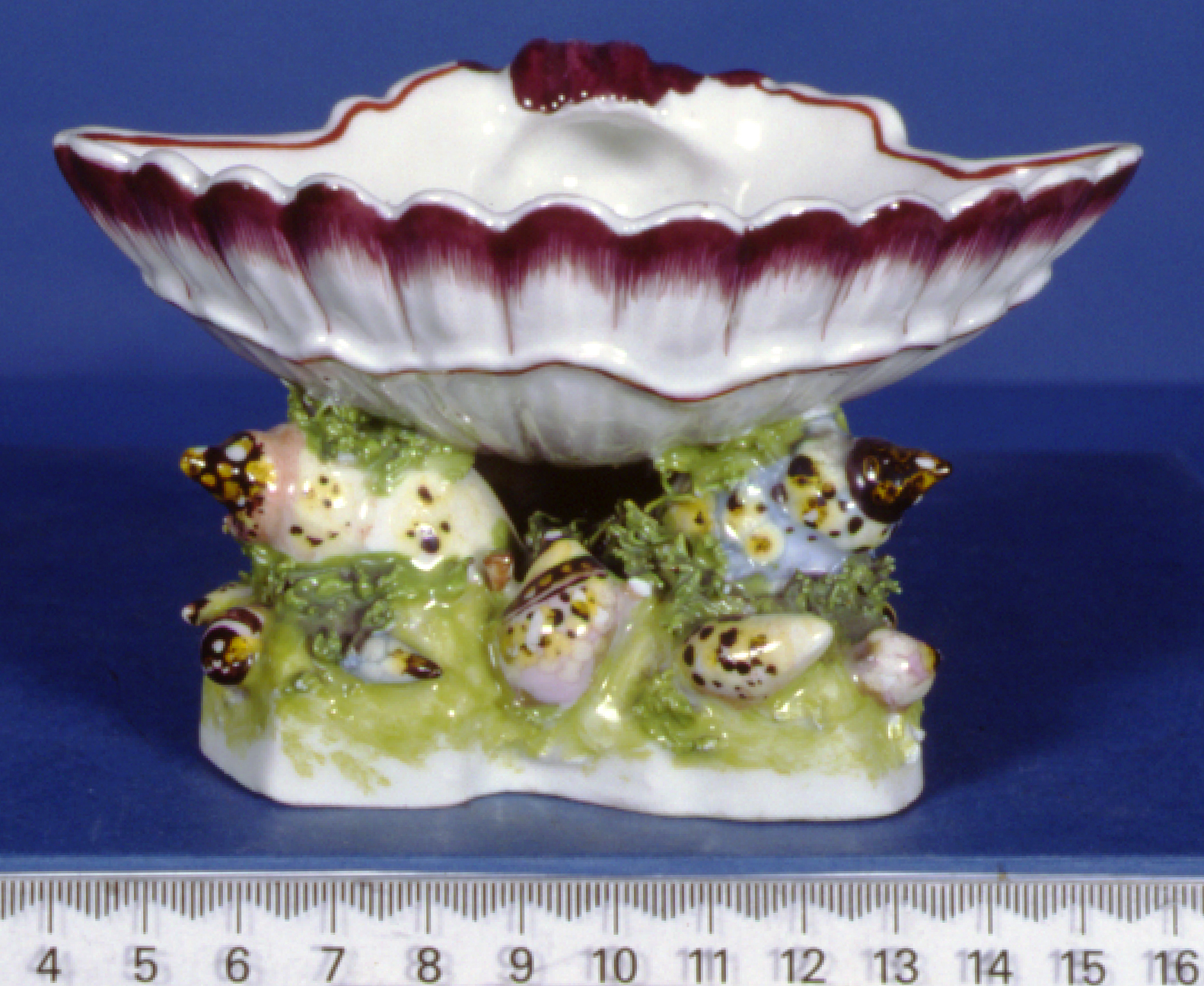
Small Plymouth "shell-salt" in scallop shape

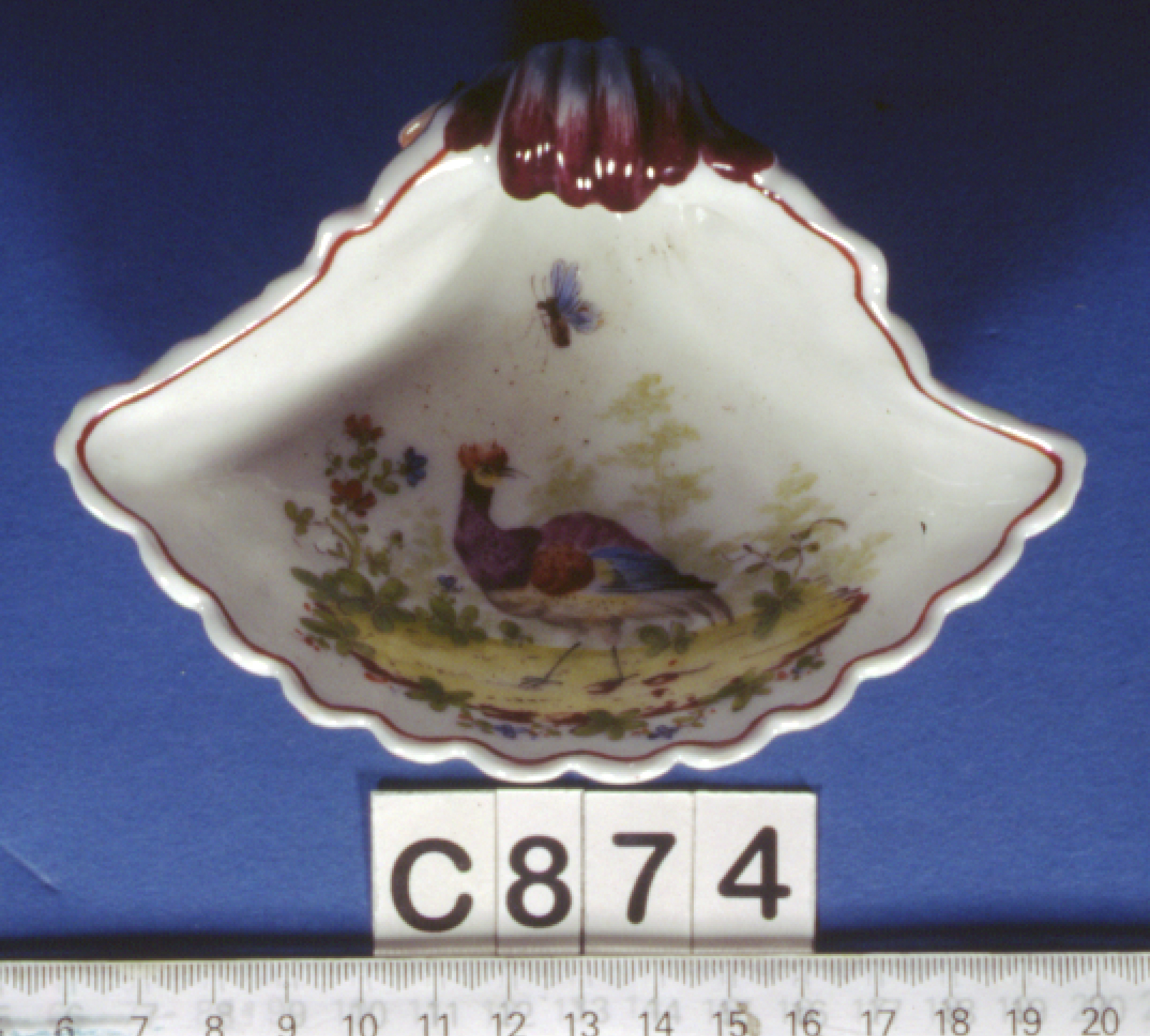
Interior
