= François Xavier d'Entrecolles =

French Jesuit priest

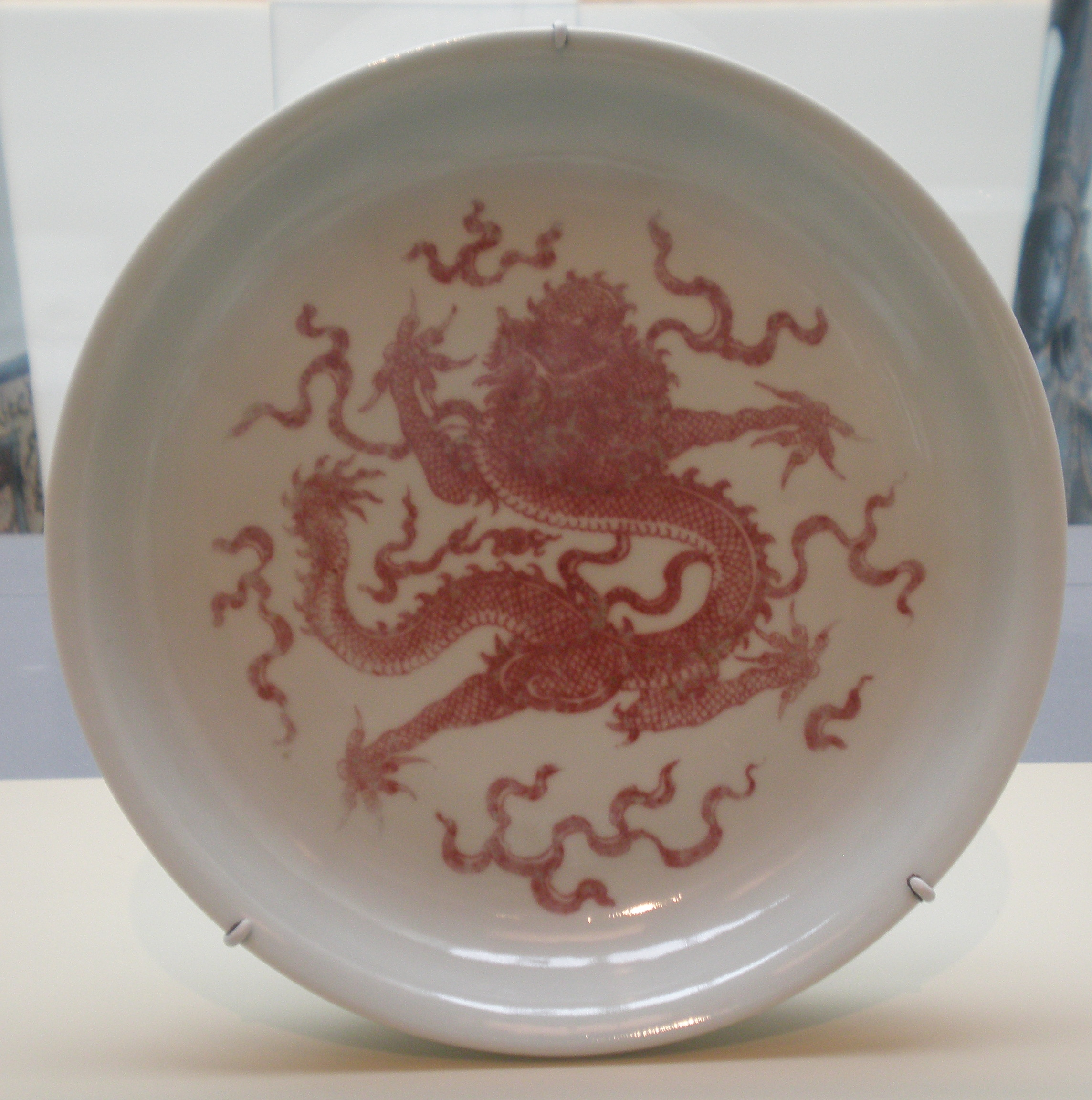
Jingdezhen porcelain dish, which was studied by Francois Xavier d'Entrecolles

François Xavier d'Entrecolles (1664 in Lyon – 1741 in Beijing; Chinese name: 殷弘绪, Yin Hongxu) was a French Jesuit priest, who learned the Chinese technique of manufacturing porcelain through his investigations in China at Jingdezhen with the help of Chinese Catholic converts between 1712 and 1722, during the rule of the Kangxi Emperor. His observations were published in a long letter in 1712, and carefully studied in several European countries, even though Meissen porcelain was already making hard-paste porcelain in Germany by then. The letter's author was given as Père d'Entrecolles ("Father d'Entrecolles"), and he is still very often referred to as this.

== Religious career ==
D'Entrecolles entered the Society of Jesus in 1682. He arrived in China in 1698 to become a member of the Jesuit China missions. Initially proselytizing in Jiangxi, he then became Superior General of the French Jesuits in China from 1706 to 1719.

D'Entrecolles was then Superior of the French Residence in Beijing from 1722 to 1732. He died in Beijing in 1741.

== Manufacture of porcelain ==
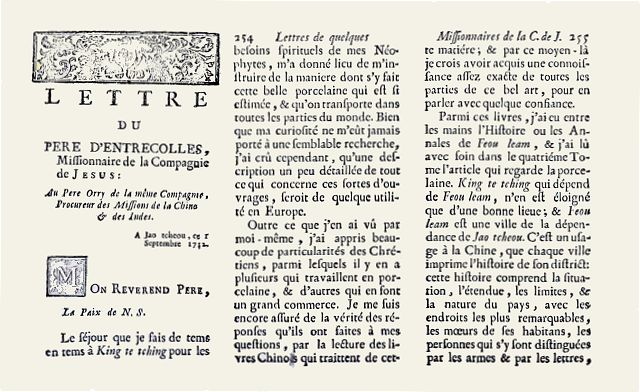
Section of the letter from d'Entrecolles, 1712, re-published by Jean-Baptiste du Halde in 1735.

Independently of d'Entrecolles, but unknown to him, in 1710, the German Johann Friedrich Böttger (and possibly Ehrenfried Walther von Tschirnhaus before him in 1708) had already discovered the secret of hard-paste porcelain manufacture, which led to the establishment of the Meissen Porcelain Manufactory. D'Entrecolles used direct observation at the kilns, as well as the technical knowledge of some of his converts, and also directly consulted Chinese technical sources, thought to be the 1682 printing of the Fu-liang Hsien Chih.

D'Entrecolles sent back to Father Orry, S.J., Procator of the Jesuit missions in China and the Indies, a detailed, very comprehensive and well-structured letter to communicate his findings:

"From time to time I have stayed in Ching-tê-chên to administer to the spiritual necessities of my converts, and so I have interested myself in the manufacture of this beautiful porcelain, which is so highly prized, and is sent to all parts of the world. Nothing but my curiosity could ever have prompted me to such researches, but it appears to me that a minute description of all that concerns this kind of work might, somehow, be useful in Europe." Introduction of "The Letters of Père d'Entrecolles".

The letters were sent to Father Louis-François Orry, treasurer in Paris of the Jesuit missions to China and India, who soon had them published in the Jesuit missions' annual report Lettres édifiantes et curieuses de Chine par des missionnaires jésuites (1702–1776). They were again published by Jean-Baptiste Du Halde in 1735, with English editions appearing in 1736 or 1738. The letters were later again published by Abbé Jean-Baptiste Grosier in his General Description of China. D'Entrecolles also sent material specimens to Europe, which were analysed by Réaumur, and led to the establishment of the Sèvres Manufactory once equivalent materials were found in Europe.

In England, his work encouraged the creation of various porcelain works, such as Plymouth porcelain.

D'Entrecolles left Jingdezhen for Beijing to take new responsibilities in 1723.

He died in Beijing in 1741.

== Other works ==
D'Entrecolles also wrote letters about how the Chinese raised silkworms, and manufactured artificial flowers and synthetic pearls, and practised oral vaccination against smallpox. In 1734, d'Entrecolles also discussed how the Chinese manufactured mercury.

As a result of d'Entrecolles' work, which has sometimes been described as industrial espionage, Chinese exports of porcelain soon shrank considerably, especially by the end of the reign of the Qianlong Emperor.

D'Entrecolles was also a translator of Chinese scientific works into French.

== Legacy ==
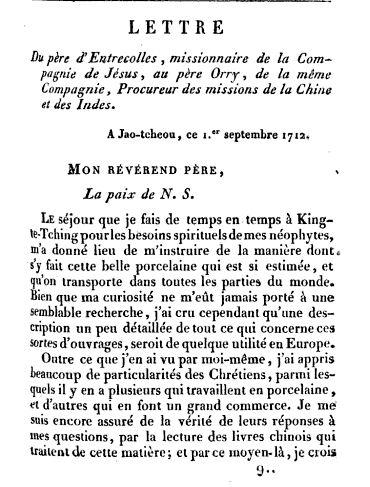
1712 letter of d'Entrecolles about the Chinese manufacture of Porcelain, 1819 edition.

Following the publication by Father Orry, and later by Jean-Baptiste du Halde in his Description de l'Empire de la Chine (1735), d'Entrecolles' account was used verbatim with attribution in Diderot's Encyclopédie (1751–1772).

Josiah Wedgwood, the famous English porcelain manufacturer, is known to have copied extracts of d'Entrecolles' work in his Commonplace Book. D'Entrecolles' work was also reproduced, without attribution, in Malachy Postlethwayt's widely influential Universal Dictionary of Trade and Commerce (1757–1774).

== See also ==
- Orientalism in early modern France
- Jesuit China missions
