= Jean-Baptiste Grosier =

French abbé and critic of art and literature

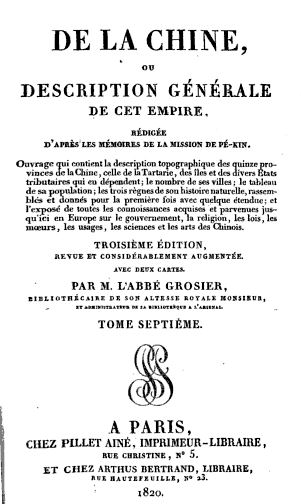
De la Chine, by Jean-Baptiste Grosier, 1820 edition

Jean-Baptiste Gabriel Alexandre Grosier (17 March 1743 – 8 December 1823) was a French abbé and critic of art and literature who published in 1788 his General Description of China.

== Works ==
- De la Chine: ou Description générale de cet empire, rédigée d'après les mémoires de la mission de Pé-Kin
