= Hard-paste porcelain =

Ceramic material

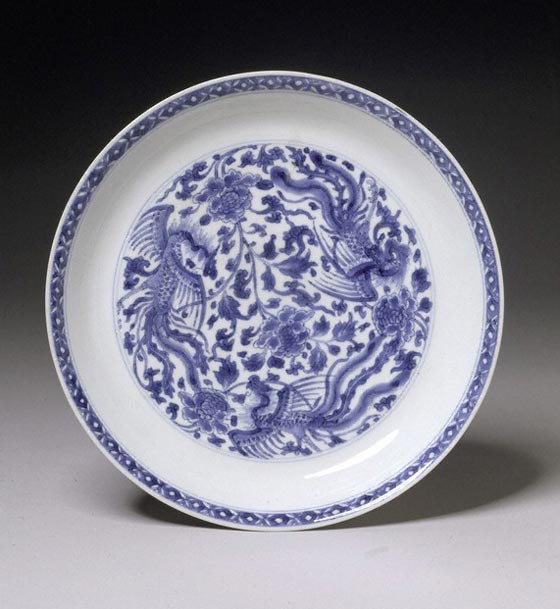
Porcelain dish, Chinese Qing, 1644–1911, Hard-paste decorated in underglaze cobalt blue V&A Museum no. 491-1931 Victoria and Albert Museum, London

Hard-paste porcelain, sometimes called "true porcelain", is a ceramic material that was originally made from a compound of the feldspathic rock petuntse and kaolin fired at a very high temperature, usually around 1400 °C. It was first made in China around the 7th or 8th century and has remained the most common type of Chinese porcelain.

From the Middle Ages onwards, it was very widely exported and admired by other cultures and fetched huge prices on foreign markets. Eventually Korean porcelain developed in the 14th century and Japanese porcelain in the 17th, but other cultures were unable to learn or reproduce the secret of its formula in terms of materials and firing temperature until it was worked out in Europe in the early 18th century and suitable mineral deposits of kaolin, feldspar, and quartz were discovered. This soon led to a large production in factories across Europe by the end of the 18th century.

Despite the huge influence of Chinese porcelain decoration on Islamic pottery, historic production in the Islamic world was all in earthenware or fritware, the latter having some of the properties of hard-paste porcelain. Europeans also developed soft-paste porcelain, fired at lower temperatures (around 1200 °C), while trying to copy the Chinese, and later bone china, which in modern times has somewhat replaced hard-paste around the world, even in China.

== History ==
Chinese porcelain began to be exported to Europe by the Portuguese and later by the Dutch from the middle of the 16th century, creating vast demand for the material. The discovery in Europe of the secret of its manufacture has conventionally been credited to Johann Friedrich Böttger of Meissen, Germany, in 1708, but it has also been claimed that English manufacturers or Ehrenfried Walther von Tschirnhaus produced porcelain first. Certainly, the Meissen porcelain factory, established 1710, was the first to produce porcelain in Europe in large quantities and since the recipe was kept a trade secret by Böttger for his company, experiments continued elsewhere throughout Europe. Vienna porcelain became the second European manufacturer in 1718, followed by Vezzi porcelain in Venice in 1720.

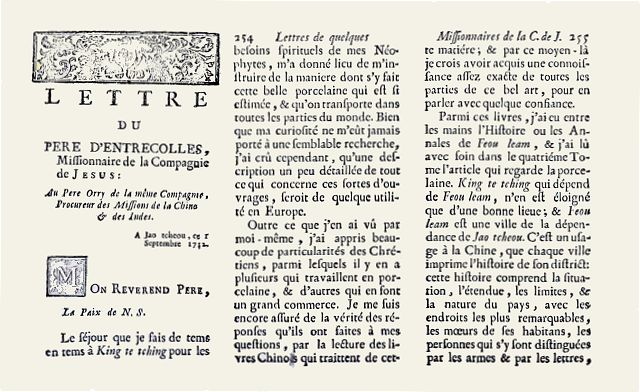
Section of the letter of François Xavier d'Entrecolles about Chinese porcelain manufacturing techniques, 1712, published by Jean-Baptiste du Halde in 1735

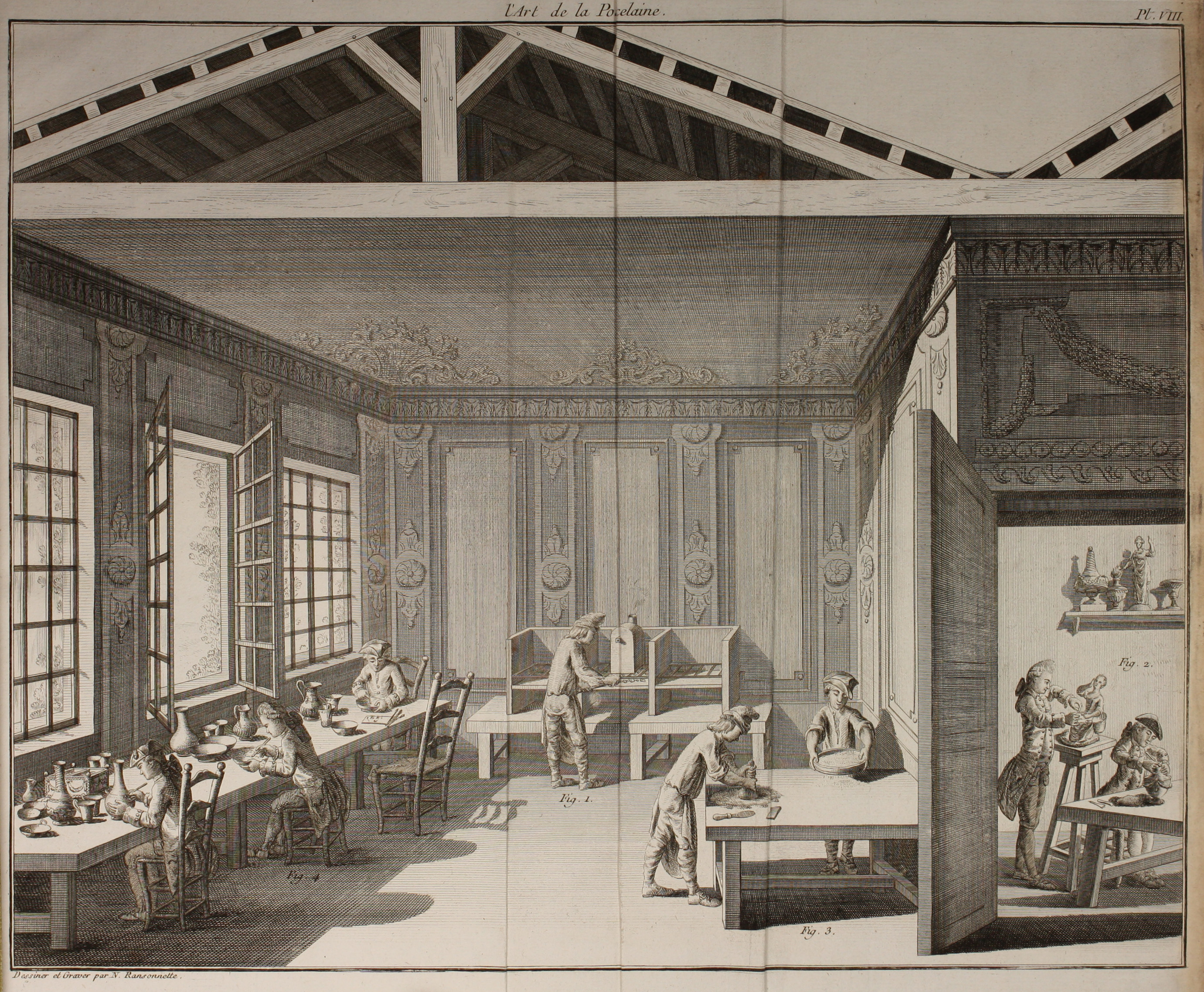
French porcelain factory, 1771

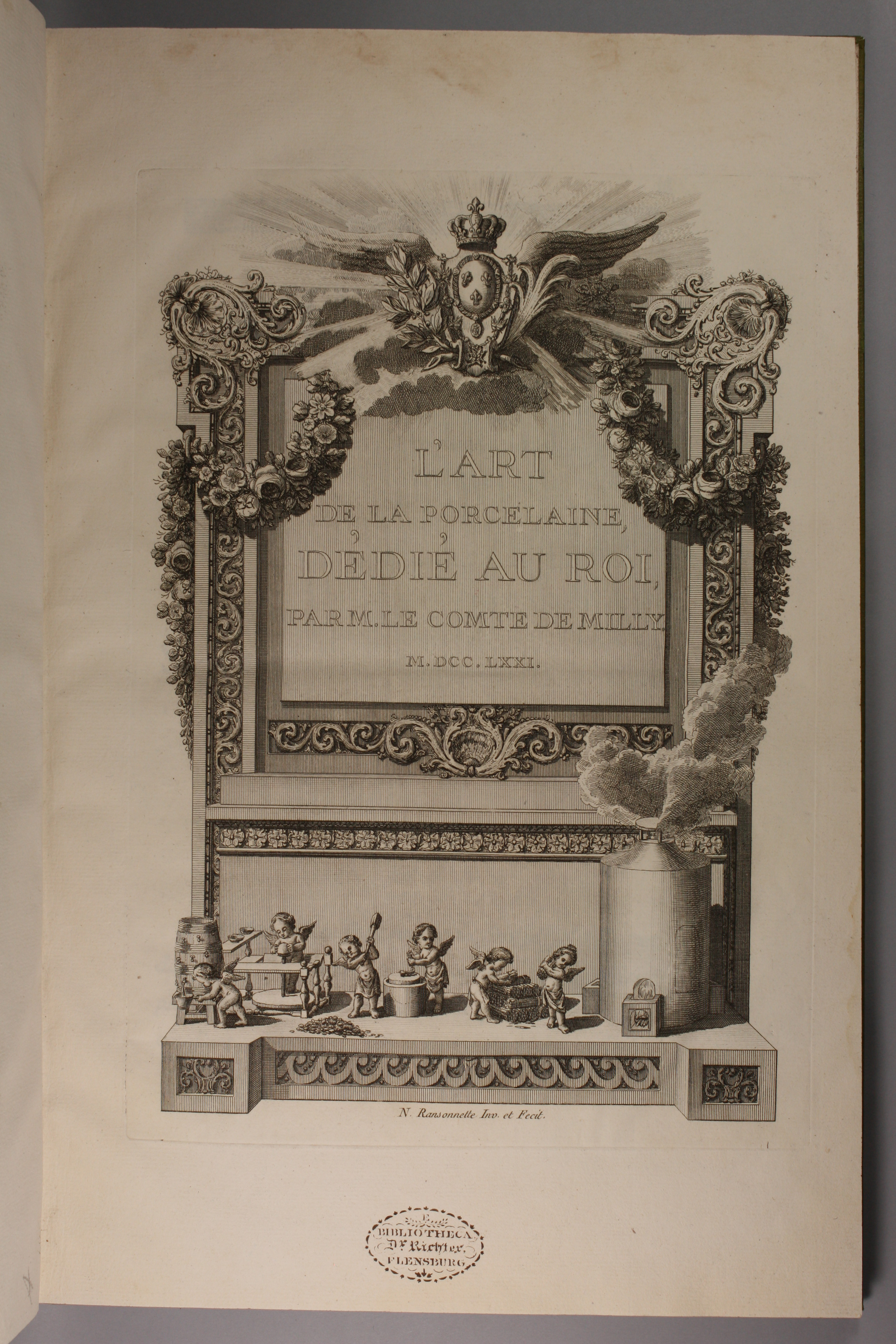
Comte de Milly's L'art de la porcelaine, 1771

In 1712, the French Jesuit François Xavier d'Entrecolles described the Chinese process of manufacturing porcelain in his letters to Europe. In 1771, the comte de Milly published L'art de la porcelaine, a detailed account of the processes of creating hard-paste porcelain, ending its prestige as a rare and valuable material.

Hard-paste chiefly refers to formulations prepared from mixtures of kaolin, feldspar and quartz. Other raw materials can also be used and these include pottery stones, which historically were known as petunse although this name has long fallen out of use.

== Characteristics ==
Hard-paste porcelain is differentiated from soft-paste porcelain mainly by the firing temperature, with the former being higher, to around 1400 °C, and the latter to around 1200 °C.

Depending on the raw materials and firing methods used, hard-paste porcelain can also resemble stoneware or earthenware. Hard-paste porcelain can also be used for unglazed biscuit porcelain.

It is a translucent and bright, white ceramic. Hard-paste has the advantage over soft-paste that it is less likely to crack when exposed to hot liquids, but the higher firing temperature of hard-paste may necessitate a second "glost" firing for the decoration.
