= Garner (surname) =

Garner is an English surname. Notable people with the surname include:

- Abigail Garner (born 1975), American author and advocate
- Alan Garner (disambiguation), several people
- Alice Garner (born 1969), Australian actress, author, musician, teacher and historian
- Alfred Buckwalter Garner (1873–1930), American politician, Republican member of the U.S. House of Representatives from Pennsylvania
- Amanda Garner (born 1985), Australian ballroom dancer
- Andrea Garner (born 1979), American basketball player
- Andy Garner (born 1966), English footballer
- Anthony Garner (1927–2015), political organiser for the British Conservative Party
- Archibald Garner (1904–1969), American sculptor
- Arthur Garner (1851–c. 1934), British and Australian theatrical entrepreneur
- Ben Garner (born 1980), Engliash football coach
- Bill Garner (disambiguation), several people
- Blair Garner, American radio host
- Bob Garner (1934–1990), American football player
- Brett Garner (fl. 2020s), American politician
- Bryan A. Garner (born 1958), American usage guide author
- Carl Garner (1915–2014), American engineer
- Carley Garner (born 1977), American commodity market strategist and futures and options broker
- Charles Garner (footballer), English footballer
- Charlie Garner (born 1972), American football player
- Chloe Garner (born 1990), South African and American long driver
- Chris Garner (disambiguation), several people
- Christie Garner (born 1973), American volleyball player
- Cindy Garner (1926–2000), American actress and model
- Cliff Garner (1937–2010), American racing driver
- Cole Garner (Robert Cole Garner; born 1984), American baseball player
- Connie Garner (born 1979), fitness competitor
- Craig Garner (born 1971), New Zealand cricketer
- Darlene Garner, American minister, and LGBT activist
- Darren Garner (born 1971), English footballer
- David Garner (disambiguation), several people
- Denise Garner (born 1956), American politician, member of the Arkansas House of Representatives
- Doreen Garner (born 1986), American sculptor and performance artist
- Duncan Garner (born 1974), New Zealand radio and television host and journalist
- Dwight Garner (born 1965), American writer and journalist
- Dwight Garner (American football) (1964–2022), American football player
- Dylan Garner (born 1998), American stock car driver
- Eli Garner (born 1991), American soccer player
- Elvira Garner (1886–1956), American author and illustrator
- Eric Garner (1970–2014), American man who died upon arrest
- Elizabeth Garner, pen name of the Scottish-born author and politician Elma Napier (1892–1973)
- Eleazer Garner (1887–1937), Canadian real estate and insurance agent, lawyer, farmer and politician
- Erica Garner (1990–2017), American activist
- Erroll Garner (1923–1977), American jazz pianist and composer
- Françoise Garner (1933–2024), French opera singer
- Frank Garner, American politician, Republican member of the Montana House of Representatives
- George Garner (1892–1971), American vocalist and choral director
- Gerard Garner, English football player
- Glyn Garner (born 1976), Welsh football player
- Grace Garner (born 1997), British racing cyclist
- Greg Garner (born 1980), English rugby union referee
- Gretchen Garner (1939–2017), American art historian, curator, writer, teacher and photographer
- Hal Garner (born 1962), American college football player
- Harold Garner (born 1954), American biophysicist
- Harry Garner (1891–1977), British expert on oriental ceramics
- Helen Garner (born 1942), Australian novelist
- Horace Garner (1923–1995), American baseball outfielder
- Hugh Garner (1913–1979), British-born Canadian novelist
- Irene Sandiford-Garner (born 1961), Barbadian politician, journalist, businesswoman and activist
- Jack Garner (footballer) (1872–?), Welsh international footballer
- Jack Garner (1926–2011), American actor, The Rockford Files
- James Garner (disambiguation), several people
- Jasmine Garner (born 1994), Australian football player
- Jay Garner (1929–2011), American actor
- Jay Garner (born 1938), United States Army general
- Jeff Garner (born 1978), American fashion designer and visual artist
- Jennifer Garner (born 1972), American actress
- Jill Garner, Australian architect
- Joe Garner (born 1988), English footballer
- Joe Garner (author), American radio executive and author
- Joel Garner (born 1952), West Indian cricketer
- Joel Garner (footballer) (born 1999), Australian football player
- John Garner (disambiguation), several people
- Joseph Garner (disambiguation), several people
- Julia Garner (born 1994), American actress
- Karen Garner (died 2023), American victim of police brutality
- Kathy Garner, American lawyer, and judge
- Keith Vincent Garner (born 1955), Australia minister
- Kelli Garner (born 1984), American actress
- Kimberley Garner (born 1990), English swimwear designer and actress
- Kristin Garner, American country music singer-songwriter
- Larry Garner (born 1952), American blues musician
- Leonard R. Garner Jr., American television director and actor
- Linton Garner (1915–2003), American jazz pianist
- Louis Garner (born 1994), English football player
- Loyal Garner (1946–2001), Hawaiian musician
- Lucile Garner (1910–2013), Canada's first flight attendant, first woman to be employed by Trans-Canada Air Lines (Air Canada)
- Luke Garner (born 1995), Australian rugby player
- Mack Garner (1898–1936), American jockey, 1934 Kentucky Derby winner
- Manasseh Garner (born 1992), American football player
- Marcellite Garner (1910–1993), American artist and voice actress, first regular voice of Minnie Mouse
- Margaret Garner, United States fugitive slave
- Mariette Rheiner Garner (1869–1948), wife of John Nance Garner
- Mark Garner (born 1969), Australian track and field sprinter
- Martin Garner (disambiguation), several people
- Marty Garner (born 1967), American wrestler
- Mary Field Garner (1836–1943), Mormon pioneer
- Mary Texas Hurt Garner (1928–1997), American politician, Secretary of State of Alabama (1955–1959)
- Mekhi Garner (born 2000), American football player
- Michael Garner (born 1954), English theatre and television actor
- Nadine Garner (born 1970), Australian actress
- Nate Garner (born 1985), American football player
- Nelson Garner (born 1976), American football player
- Paul Garner (1909–2004), American actor
- Paul Garner (comedian) (born 1968/69), English comedian, writer, producer and director
- Peggy Ann Garner (1932–1984), American actress
- Perci Garner (born 1988), American baseball player
- Peter M. Garner (1809–1868), American abolitionist
- Phil Garner (1949–2026), American baseball player and manager
- Phillip Garner (1946–2009), English cricketer
- Philippe Garner (born 1949), French photography auctioneer
- Pippa Garner (1942–2024), American artist
- Rex Garner (1921–2015), British-born South African actor and director
- Richard Garner (born 1969), Canadian sports broadcaster, vice-president of programming at The Score Television Network
- Richard Lynch Garner (1848–1920), American primatologist
- Richie Garner, American basketball player
- Rob Garner (born 1958), Canadian ice hockey player
- Robert Garner (born 1960), British political scientist, animal rights scholar
- Robert Francis Garner (1920–2000), American Catholic bishop
- Robby Garner (born 1963), American natural language programmer
- Ryan Garner (born 1998), English professional boxer
- Samuel Paul Garner (1910–1996), American accounting scholar
- Sarah Garner (born 1971), American Olympic rower
- Scott Garner (born 1989), English football player
- Sean R. Garner, American physicist
- Simon Garner (born 1959), English football player
- Stanton Garner, American historian
- Steve Garner, American bridge player
- Stuart Garner (born 1968), British businessman
- Taylor Garner (born 1994), Australian football player
- Thomas Garner (disambiguation), several people
- Todd Garner, American film producer
- Tom Garner (born 1961), American golfer
- Trent Garner (fl. 2010s–2020s), American politician from Arkansas
- Tyrone Garner (disambiguation), several people
- Wayne Garner (born 1951), American politician from Georgia
- Wendell Garner (1921–2008), American cognitive psychologist
- William Garner (disambiguation), several people
- Wix Garner (1897–1978), American sports coach and college athletics administrator
