= Jensen Hughes =

Engineering company in the United States

Jensen Hughes, Inc.
- Trade name: Jensen Hughes
- Formerly: Hughes Associates; Rolf Jensen & Associates, Inc.
- Type: Private
- Industry: Fire protection engineering
- Founded: 1980; 46 years ago
- Headquarters: Baltimore, Maryland
- Parent: New Mountain Capital
- Website: www.jensenhughes.com

Jensen Hughes (previously stylized as JENSEN HUGHES) is a Baltimore, Maryland-based professional engineering and consulting services company that provides services, software, and consulting in fire protection engineering, forensic engineering, and security.

Led by Raj Arora, who has been its CEO since 2019, it has approximately 90 offices globally in part due to its acquisitions of and mergers with related safety and security middle-market companies in recent years.

Its projects include conducting forensic investigations of fire accident scenes on behalf of local courts, studying fire dynamics of chemicals with the National Institute of Justice, and working with healthcare associations to stock local clinical practices and hospitals with PPE and other medical supplies.

== History ==
=== Acquisitions ===
Hughes Associates, a fire protection engineering consultancy, was founded in 1980 in Baltimore and, among other projects, performed safety upgrades to historic buildings and landmarks such as the Library of Congress. In 2011, as part of a larger movement into the professional services sector, the private equity firm Huron Capital partners signed an agreement with the management team of Hughes Associates to recapitalize the business.

The business later became Jensen Hughes following a merger with Rolf Jensen & Associates, Inc., a firm founded by Illinois Institute of Technology professor and safety engineer Rolf Jensen. In 2015, Gryphon Investors acquired Jensen Hughes from Huron Capital partners. Since then, Jensen Hughes itself has gone on to acquire additional companies, strengthening its Fire Engineering Consultancy through the acquisition of JGA Fire Engineering in August 2018.

=== Karen Gardner report ===
In response to the public outcry surrounding the city's police actions during the arrest of the elderly Karen Gardner, the company was hired to investigate the Loveland police department. Jensen Hughes found that the officers failed to further investigate whether Garner was injured.

== Awards and scholarships ==
Jensen Hughes has placed in the Building Design + Construction Top 80 Engineering Firms list and, in 2019, it placed in two of Engineering News-Record lists, Top 225 International Design Firms and Top 500 Design firms. In 2018, Siemens awarded Jensen Hughes its annual Engineering Innovation Award for Fire, and Life Safety Design.

Jensen Hughes endows the yearly Rolf H. Jensen Award for Outstanding Committee Service through the Society of Fire Protection Engineers. It also sponsors the Jensen Hughes Graduate Fire Safety Award at the University of Waterloo.
