= Mary Garner =

Mary Garner may refer to:

- Mary Field Garner (1836–1943), English-born American member of the Church of Jesus Christ of Latter-day Saints and Mormon pioneer
- Mary Texas Hurt Garner (1928–1997), politician from Alabama
- USS Mary B. Garner (SP-682), a United States Navy minesweeper
