= Sakaida Kakiemon XIV =

Sakaida Kakiemon XIV (Japanese: 14代酒井田柿右衛門), or Sakaida Masashi (26 August 1934 – 15 June 2013) was a Japanese potter, ceramicist and former Living National Treasure in Japan. He was a member of the 14th generation of the Kakiemon Family, which dates back to the beginning of the Edo period with Sakaida Kakiemon. He continued the tradition of Kakiemon enameled ceramics, succeeding the name Kakiemon after the death of his father Sakaida Kakiemon XIII from cancer in 1982. In 2010, Kakiemon was interviewed as an expert for the seventy-ninth episode of A History of the World in 100 Objects, a joint project of BBC Radio 4 and the British Museum, concerning the Kakiemon elephants held by the museum.

Kakiemon died on June 15, 2013, at the age of 78.
