= Joseph Garner =

Joseph or Joe Garner may refer to:

- Joe Garner (born 1988), English footballer
- Joseph Garner, Baron Garner (1908–1983), British diplomat
- Joe Garner (businessman) (born 1969), chief executive of Nationwide Building Society
- Joe Garner (author), American author and radio executive

== See also ==
- Joel Garner (born 1952), West Indian cricketer
