= Garner =

Garner may refer to:

== Places ==
=== United States ===
- Garner, Arkansas
- Garner, Iowa
- Garner, Missouri
- Garner, North Carolina

== Other uses ==
- Garner (surname), a surname
- Granary, a grain store
- Tennessee v. Garner, a United States Supreme Court case dealing with the use of deadly force
- USS Mary B. Garner (SP-682), a United States Navy minesweeper in commission from 1917 to 1919

== See also ==
- Gartner, information technology research firm
