= Edmé Samson =

French porcelain and pottery copyist

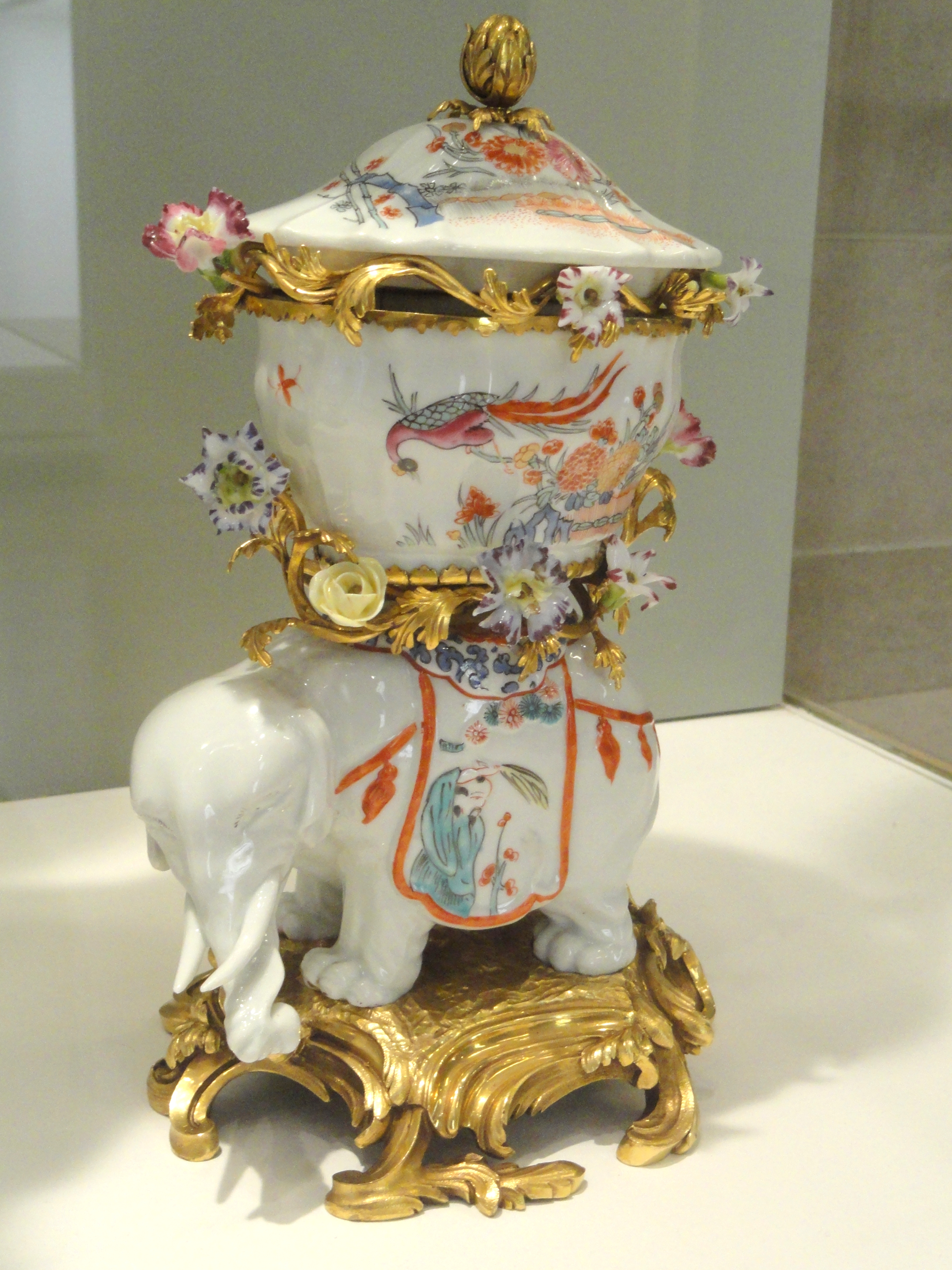
Pair of Mounted Elephants, c. 1850-1900, Samson, Edmé et Cie, Paris or Montreuil, hard-paste porcelain with overglaze enamels, gilded bronze mounts

Edmé Samson (1810, Paris – 1891, Paris) was the founder of the porcelain firm Samson, Edmé et Cie (commonly known as Samson Ceramics) and a famous copyist (and perhaps forger) of porcelain and pottery. The firm produced high-quality copies or imitations of earlier styles of porcelain, mainly 18th-century European and Chinese and Japanese porcelain, but also earlier styles such as Italian maiolica.

== Edme Samson's ceramics ==
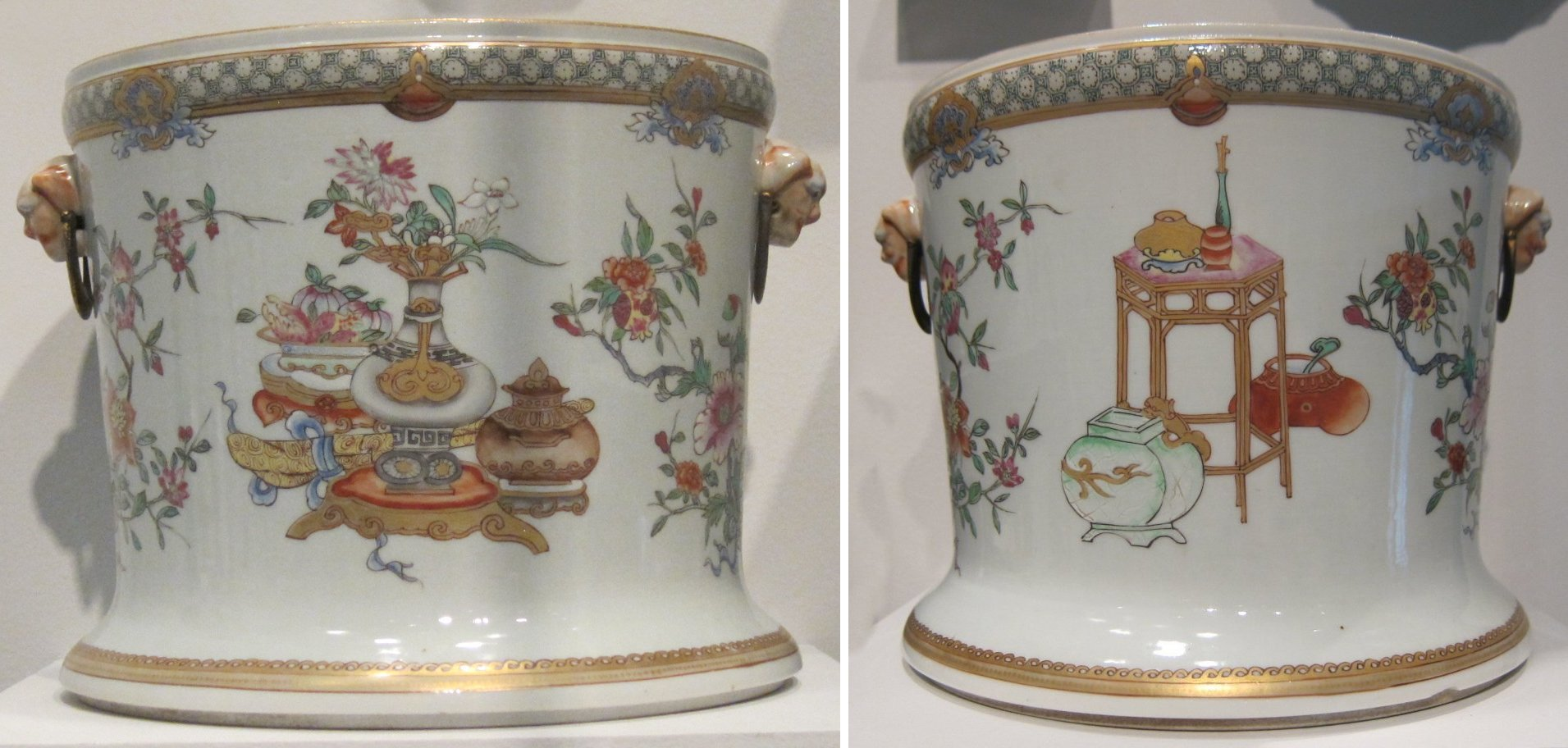
Pair of wine coolers, hard-paste porcelain, 19th century

Samson began his career by making service and set piece replacements in the late 1830s. In 1845 he opened the ceramics firm Samson, Edmé et Cie at 7, rue de Vendôme (nowadays rue Béranger) in Paris, with the intention of supplying reproductions of ceramics on display in museums and private collections. The factory was moved to Montreuil, Seine-Saint-Denis in 1871 by Samson’s son, Emile Samson (1837–1913). The firm either drew inspiration from other factories, or directly copied their pieces. 18th-century designs from the factories of Meissen, Sèvres, Chelsea, Worcester and Derby were among the reproductions Samson, Edmé et Cie produced, among designs copied from the other major European factories.

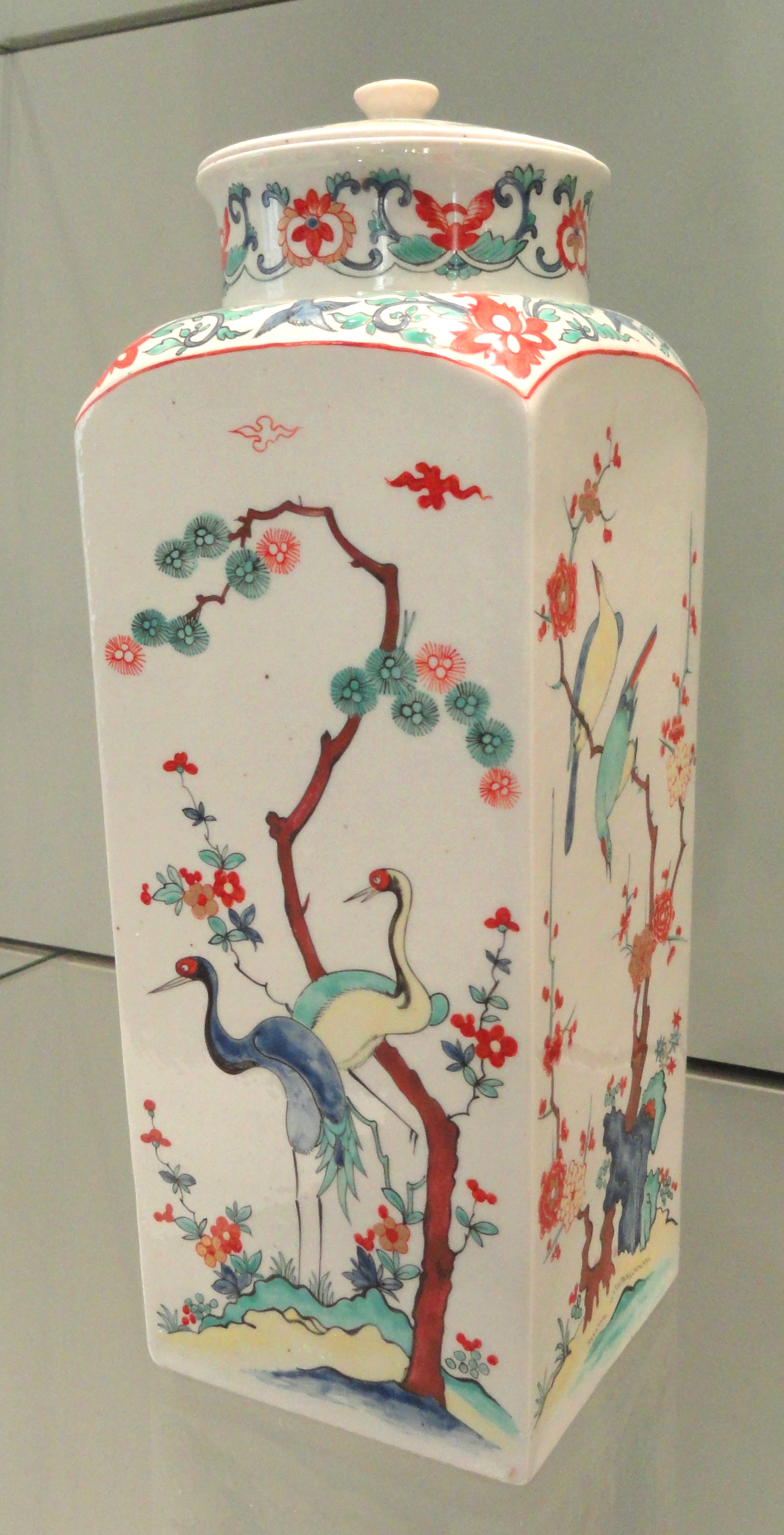
Kakiemon style covered Jar, c. 1850-1900, Samson & Cie, Paris or Montreuil, hard-paste porcelain with overglaze enamels

During the 19th century, the collectors' market for antique fine china was considerable, and Samson’s firm reproduced ceramics in a breadth of styles including the faience and maiolica types of Italian pottery, Persian style dishes, Hispano-Moresque pottery (a blending of Islamic and European motifs, produced during the 13th to 15th centuries), plates in the FitzHugh pattern, as well as plates in the manner associated with Bernard Palissy. Also copied by the Samson firm were the early Qing dynasty famille rose and famille verte Chinese porcelains and the so-called "Imari wares", named for the Japanese port where a type of richly decorated porcelain made at Arita was shipped. The firm exhibited at the International Exposition (1867) and the Exposition Universelle (1889).

== Copyist or forger ==
Samson, Edmé et Cie did not set out to produce copies with the intention to deceive, and claimed all reproductions the firm produced would be distinctly marked to avoid confusion with the originals. However, many of its products have been passed off as originals.

The Samson firm, in many instances, attempted to distinguish their reproductions from originals. The Samson wares were produced in hard-paste porcelain, while many of the originals would have been produced from soft-paste porcelain. The glazes utilized by the Samson firm were often glossy and somewhat glassy, the modeling stiffer, or wrong in scale, the decoration was often too heavy, and colors were often inaccurate. Leading many experts to conclude that Samson, and his firm, were merely enthusiastic, if sometimes clumsy, copyists.

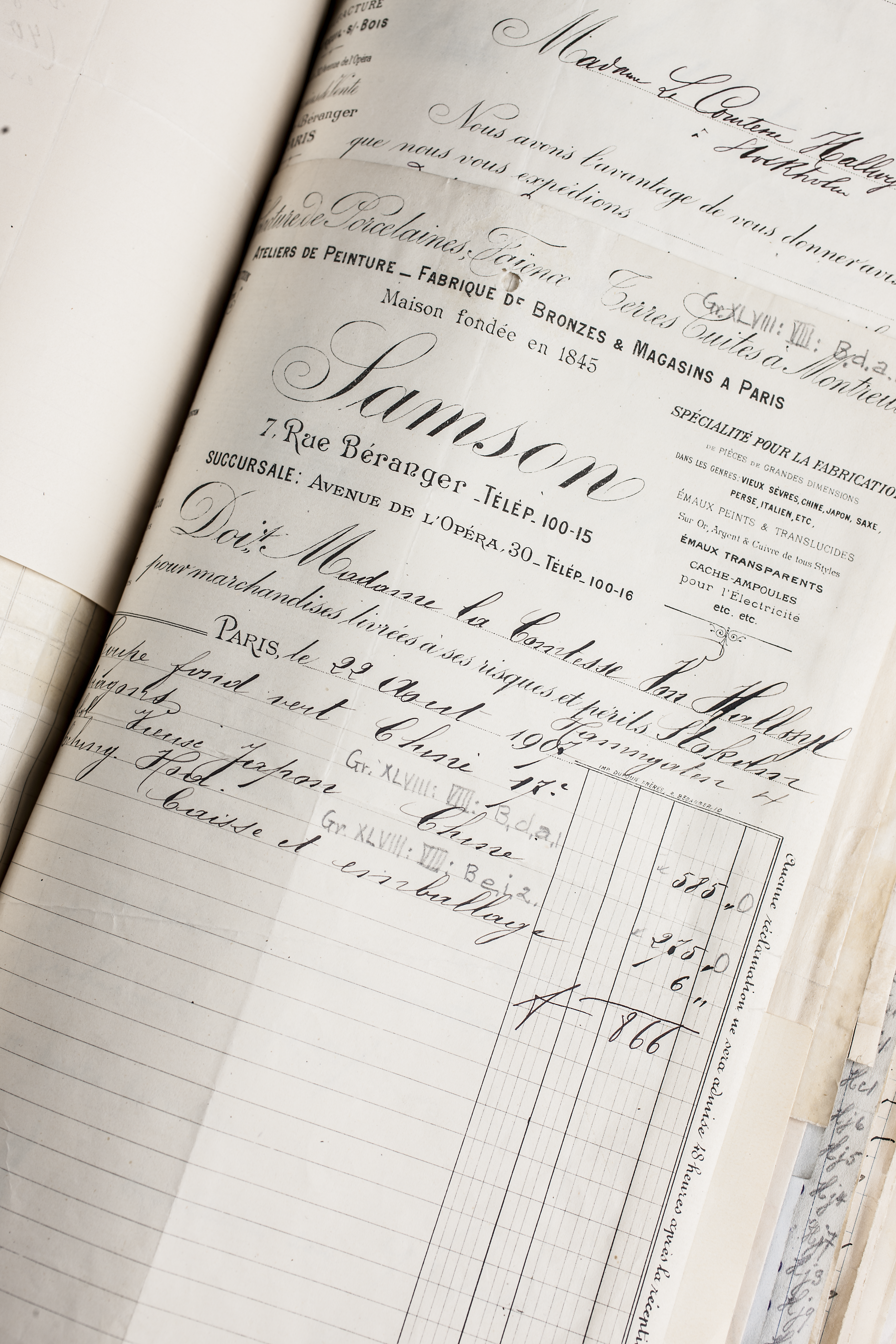
1907 invoice from the Paris shop

On the other hand, some Samson reproductions have only been detected by recognition of anachronistic details. Samson copies of Meissen pieces have passed for originals, since the blue underglaze ‘Ss’, Edmé’s mark, can be removed and substituted with false marks. Additionally, an 1880 reproduction piece by Samson, of a British East India Company armorial plate, shows evidence of scratchings, perhaps in an attempt to erase the Samson mark and pass the plate off as an original. Further complicating authenticity, numerous reproductions of Chelsea and Derby figures bear marks other than his trademark ‘Ss’, and in some instances bear no mark at all.

It is impossible to determine when, by whom, and for what reason the Samson marks might have been removed. However, during the same period, other companies, such as Jacob Petit of Fontainebleau, were producing reproductions similar to those created by the Samson firm. In Hungary the Herend company produced famille rose pieces and armorial plates. However, unlike the Samson firm’s marks, Herend utilized both impressed marks and painted ones, which cannot be erased or removed.

== Collector's items ==
The Samson, Edmé et Cie company continued to produce porcelain and pottery until 1969. The salesroom models were sold in 1979 by Christie's, London. Today many of the Samson’s pieces are collector's items. Ironically not all pieces attributed to Samson are actually Samson: there were many other Paris workshops producing similar 'copies' of earlier ceramics at the same time. Many Samson marks were removed from the piece, leaving just the assumed mark of the piece they had copied; often this is visible as a ground patch to the base. This was done in order to sell the item as the genuine article. Some pieces described as Samson were actually produced by Herend, Hungary.
