= William Garner =

William Garner may refer to:

- William Garner (novelist) (1920–2005), English novelist
- Bill Garner (footballer) (William David Garner, born 1947), English footballer
- William Carl Garner (1915–2014), American engineer
- Willie Garner (born 1955), Scottish footballer best known for playing for Aberdeen

== See also ==
- Bill Garner (disambiguation)
- Garner (disambiguation)
