= Kakiemon =

Style of Japanese porcelain

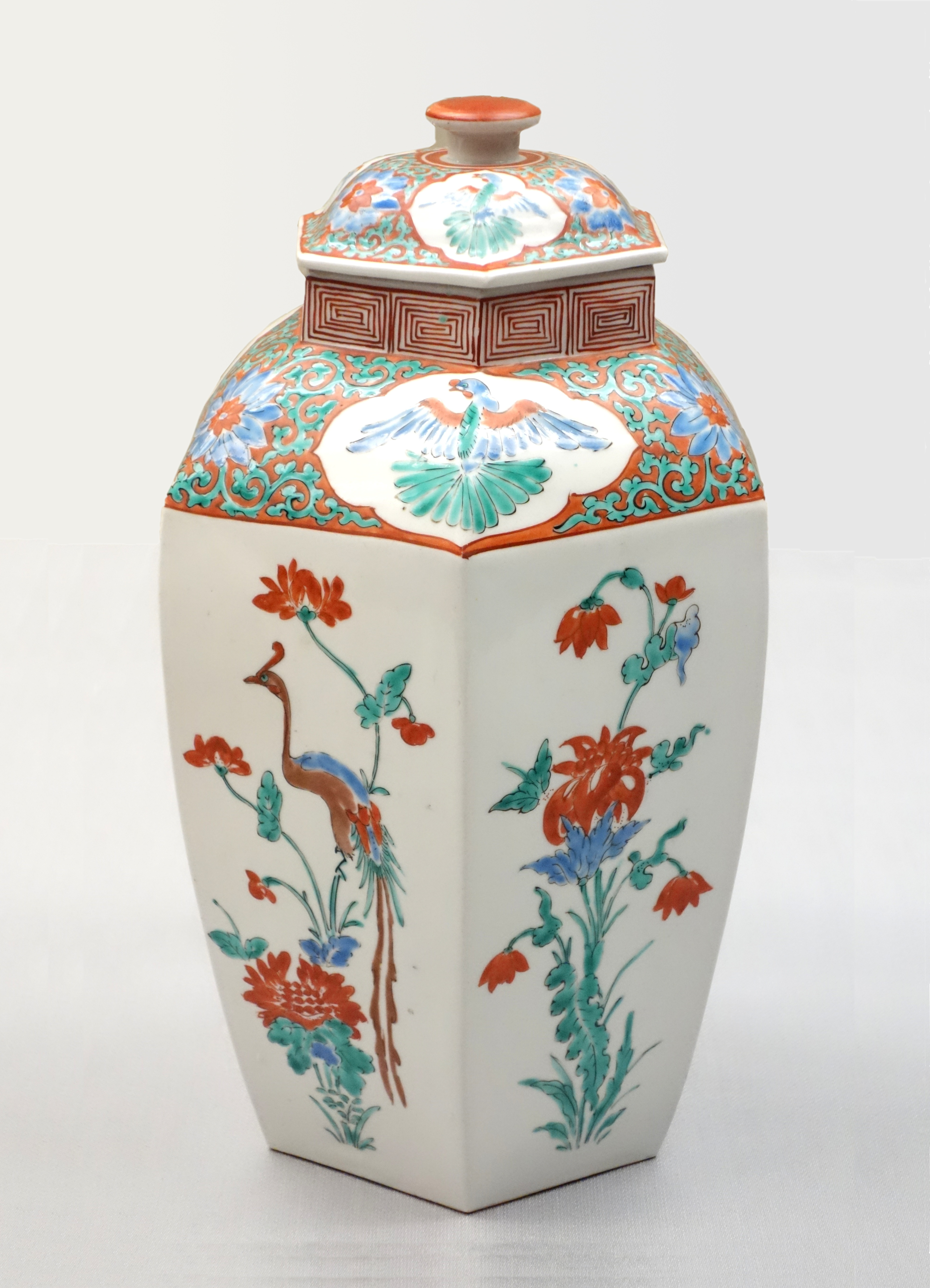
Kakiemon Imari ware hexagonal jar, flowering plant and phoenix design in overglaze enamel. Edo period, 17th century

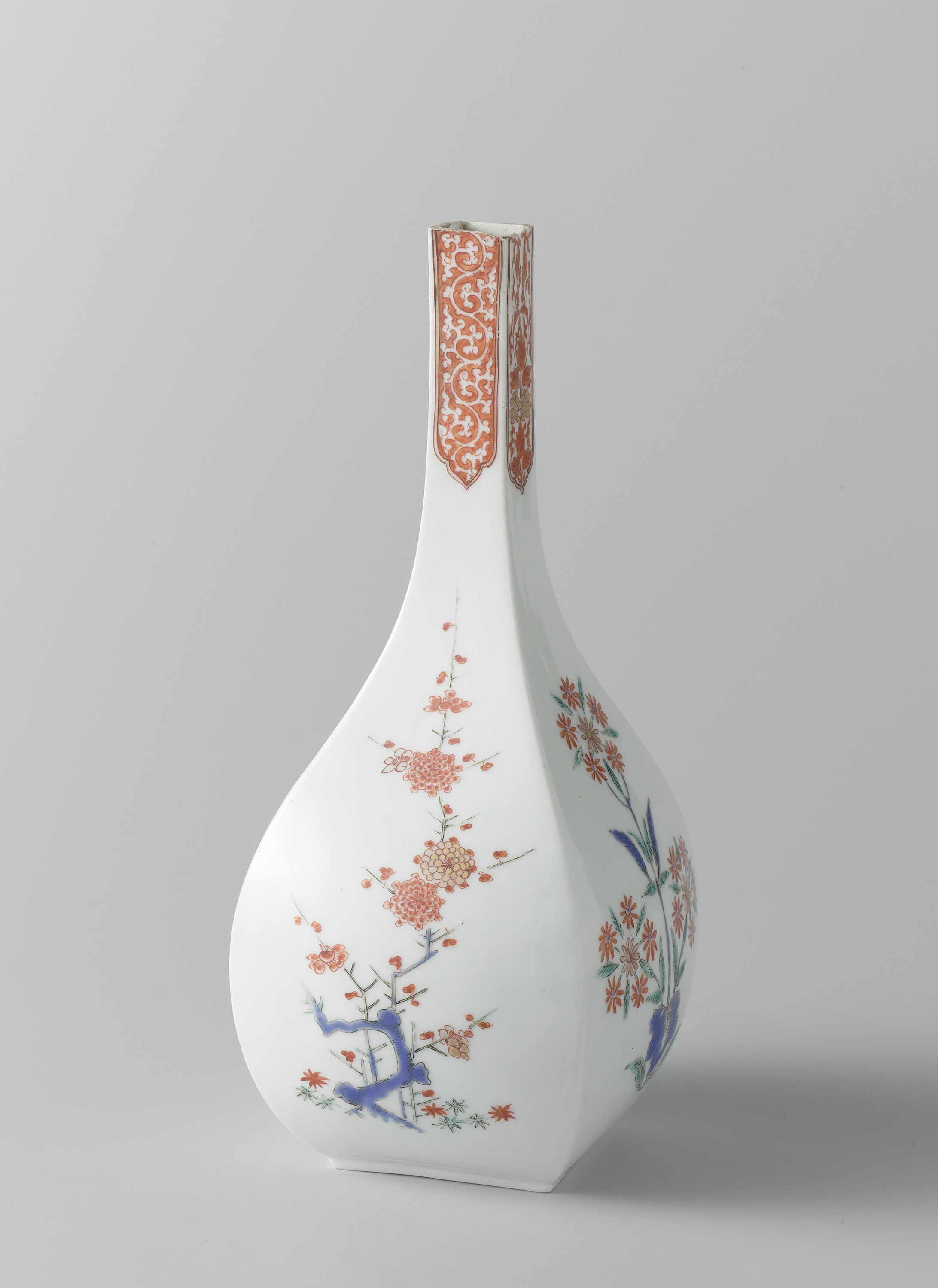
Kakiemon square bottle with plums and stylized flowers in glaze and gilding. Edo period, 1670–1690

Kakiemon (Japanese: 柿右衛門様式, Hepburn: Kakiemon yōshiki) is a style of Japanese porcelain, with overglaze decoration called "enameled" ceramics. It was originally produced at the kilns around Arita, in Japan's Hizen province (today, Saga Prefecture) from the Edo period's mid-17th century onwards. The quality of its decoration was highly prized in the West and widely imitated by major European porcelain manufacturers during the Rococo period.

Kakiemon is a term that generates some confusion, being the name of a family, one or more kilns, and a brightly-coloured overglaze style. The style originated with the family, whose kilns were the main producers of it, but other kilns also made it, and the Kakiemon kilns made other styles. Both the palette and style, and very probably the kiln, were in place by the 1680s. The style is a sub-type of what is called in the West Imari ware, the overglaze coloured variety of the broader grouping Arita ware, dominant in Japanese export porcelain in its first successful period, up to the 1740s.

The style was quickly copied by the new European porcelain factories that appeared in the 18th century, such as Meissen in Germany, Chantilly in France and Chelsea in England. The Chinese also began to copy the style for Chinese export porcelain. By about 1760 it had largely fallen from fashion in Europe.

== History ==
The potter Sakaida Kakiemon (酒井田柿右衛門, 1596–1666) is popularly credited with being one of the first in Japan to discover the secret of enamel decoration on porcelain, known as akae. The name "Kakiemon" was bestowed upon Sakaida by his lord, after he perfected a design of twin persimmons (kaki), developing as well the distinctive palette of soft red, yellow, blue and turquoise green now associated with the Kakiemon style.

The name Kakiemon is sometimes used as a generic term describing Arita wares or Imari wares made in the Arita factories using the characteristic kakiemon overglaze enamels and decorative styles.

The Kakiemon kiln seems to have been established by the 1680s, when the decorating technique was also fully developed. The early history and ownership are not very clear, and at this period the real Kakiemon enterprise may have been a decorating workshop that worked very closely with this kiln, which had developed a white porcelain body and a near-transparent glaze, superior to the other Arita producers. Shards from the kakiemon kiln site at Shimo-Nangawarayama (下南川原山) show that blue-and-white sometsuke and celadon wares were also produced, beside other styles like Ko-Kutani.

Kakiemon porcelain was exported from Japan into Europe via the Dutch East India Company, and beginning in the 1650s, through a variety of other avenues. King Augustus II the Strong of Poland and Mary II of England both owned examples. The earliest inventory to include Japanese porcelain in Europe was made at Burghley House in 1688; these included a standing elephant with its trunk raised and a model of two wrestlers.

Wares included bowls, dishes and plates, often hexagonal, octagonal or fluted with scalloped edges. The famed white nigoshide body was only used with open forms, and not for closed shapes such as vases, bottles and teapots, or for figures and animals. The hexagonal vases and covers known as "Hampton Court" vases were named after a pair at Hampton Court Palace near London, recorded in an inventory of 1696. Around 1730, this shape was copied at Meissen, Saxony, which entered into a "sister city" contract with Arita, in 1979. The style was also adopted and copied in Chelsea and Worcester in the 1750s and by Samson Ceramics in the 19th century. Statuettes were also created, an example being the Kakiemon elephants (British Museum).

Meissen copies could be extremely close to the originals; alternatively, the factory painters sometimes just borrowed designs, and used them with other shapes and styles. The style was also adapted in Germany and Austria by the Du Paquier manufactory and in France at Chantilly, Mennecy and Saint-Cloud porcelain. It was also an influence on Dutch Delft pottery and Chinese export porcelain.

Exports to Europe of Japanese Kakiemon porcelain, and all other types, stopped in the mid-18th century when China resumed export to Europe. Since both Kakiemon and Imari styles were already so popular among Europeans, Chinese export porcelain copied both styles.

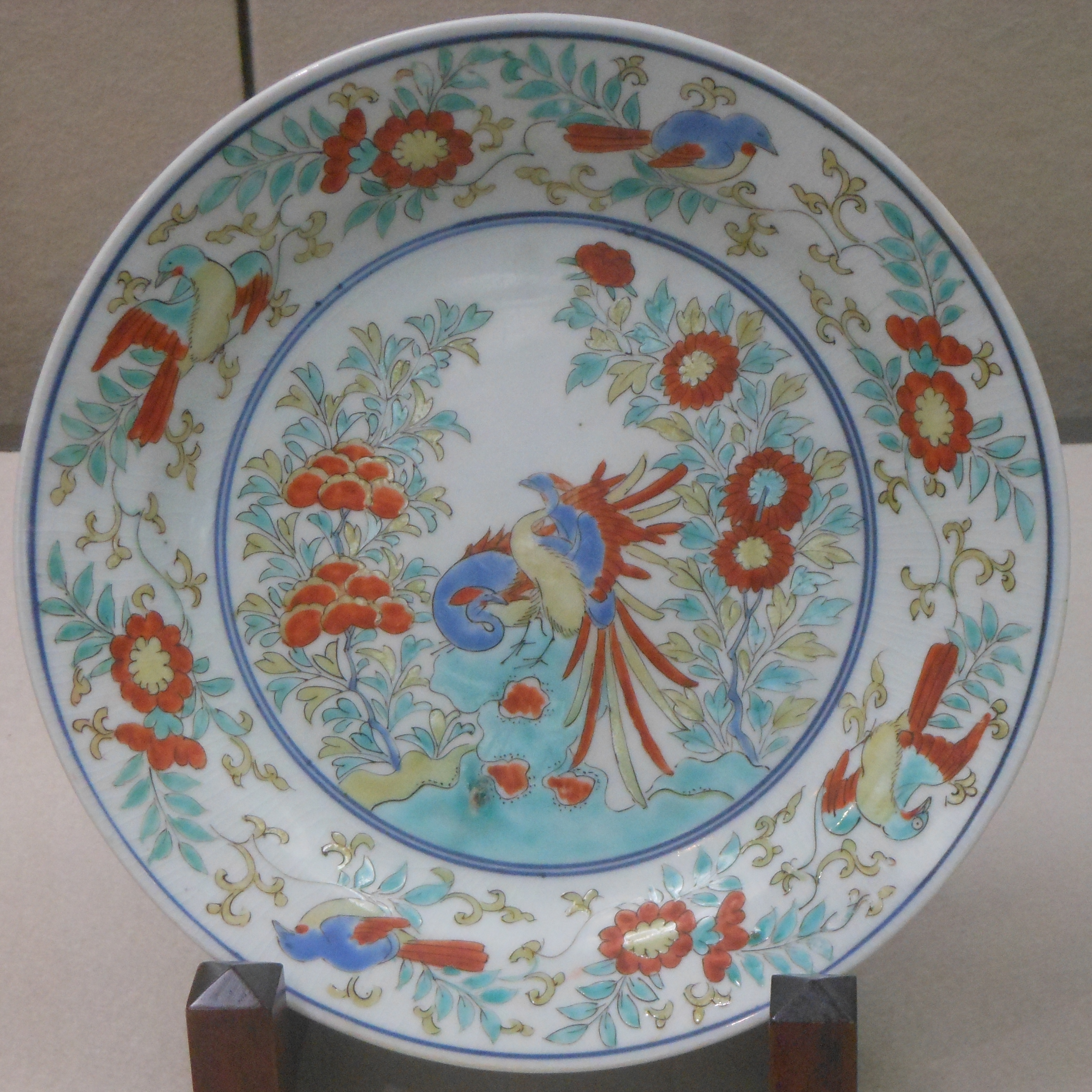
17th-century dish

In 1971 the craft technique was designated an Important Intangible Cultural Property by the Japanese government; a double climbing kiln in Arita used for the firing of Kakiemon has also been designated a National Historic Site.

Sakaida Kakiemon XIV (26 August 1934 – 15 June 2013) was designated a Living National Treasure by the government. His son Sakaida Kakiemon XV became the new head in February 2014.

=== Kakiemon Kiln Site ===
The original Kakiemon Kiln Site (柿右衛門窯跡) in Minamiyama, Arita is located behind the current Kakiemon kiln on the western slope of the Toshikiyama Hills at an elevation of approximately 85 meters. Archaeological excavations have been carried out since 1976, and the remains of two parallel kilns and a storage area where defective pottery was dumped have been confirmed. Both kiln sites are stepped, multi-chambered climbing kilns. "Kiln A" has a horizontal length of approximately 42 meters with 12 firing chambers, and an average incline of 11.5°, and the entire kiln is estimated to be approximately 60 meters in size. "Kiln B" has a length of 83 meters, and an average gradient of 13°, with 21 chambers.Each firing chamber increases in width toward the end of the kiln, spreading out like a fan. Saggars and kiln tools have also been recovered. The kiln ruins were collectively registered as a National Historic Site in 1989 due to their good state of preservation. It is estimated that the kiln was in operation in the late 17th century. Kakiemon porcelains have been produced by direct descendants. At the same time many other kilns around Arita produced wares in the same style, some using the nigoshide body.

== Characteristics ==
The decoration is usually of high quality, delicate and with asymmetric well-balanced designs. These were sparsely applied to emphasize the fine white porcelain background body known in Japan as nigoshide (milky white) which was used for the finest pieces. However, because manufacture of nigoshide is difficult due to hard contraction of the porcelain body during firing, the production was discontinued from the former part of the 18th century to mid-20th century. In this period, Sakaida Kakiemon produced normal 'akae' wares. Sakaida Kakiemon XII and XIII attempted to reproduce nigoshide and succeeded in 1953. It has continued to be produced since then.

Pieces are usually painted with birds, flying squirrels, the "Quail and Millet" design, the "Three Friends of Winter" (pine, plum, and bamboo), flowers (especially the chrysanthemum, the national flower of Japan) and figural subjects such as the popular "Hob in the Well" (shiba onko), illustrating a Chinese folk tale where a sage saves his friend who has fallen into a large fishbowl.

== Gallery ==
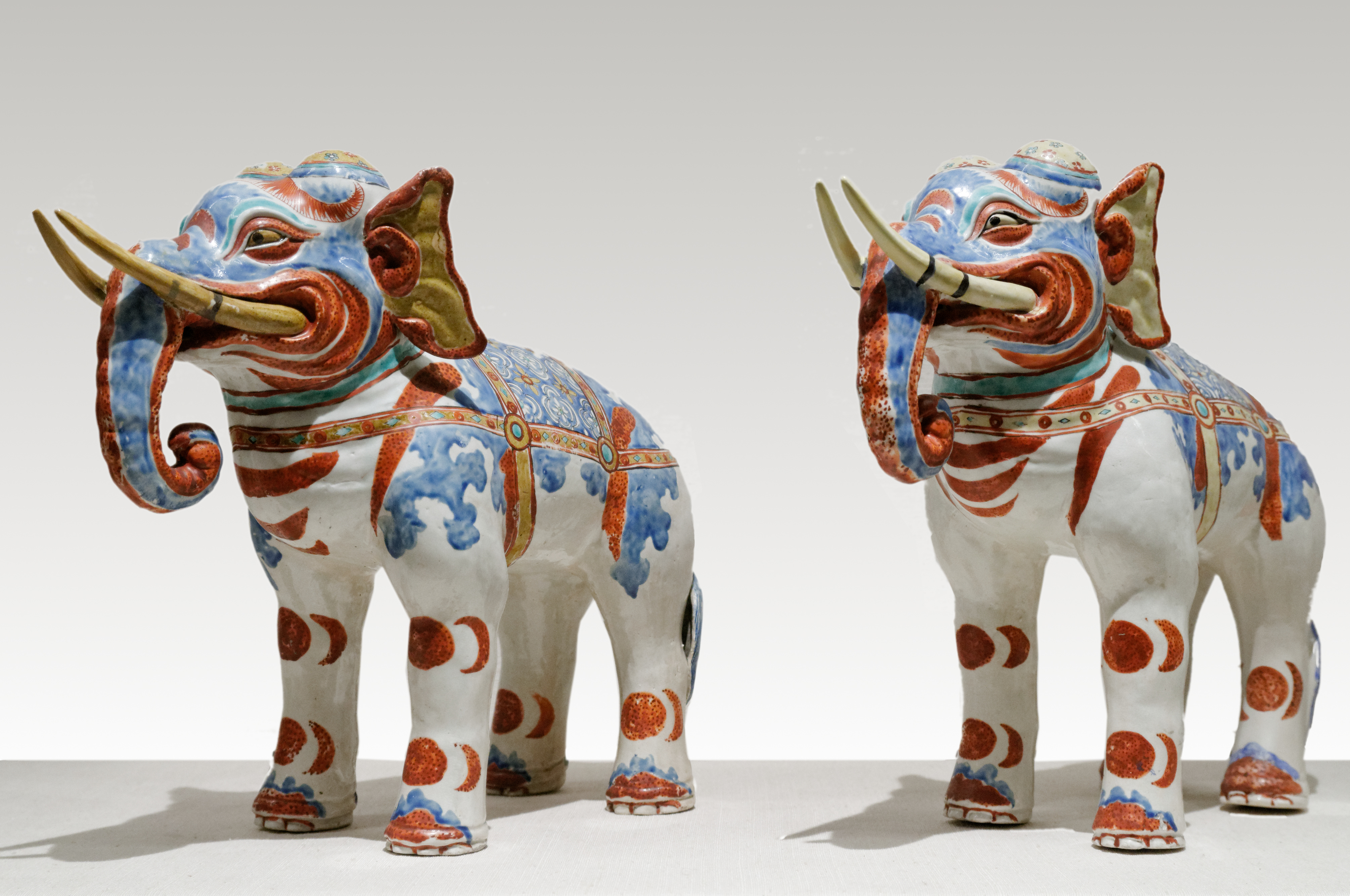
Kakiemon Hizen ware pair of model elephants. 1660–1690

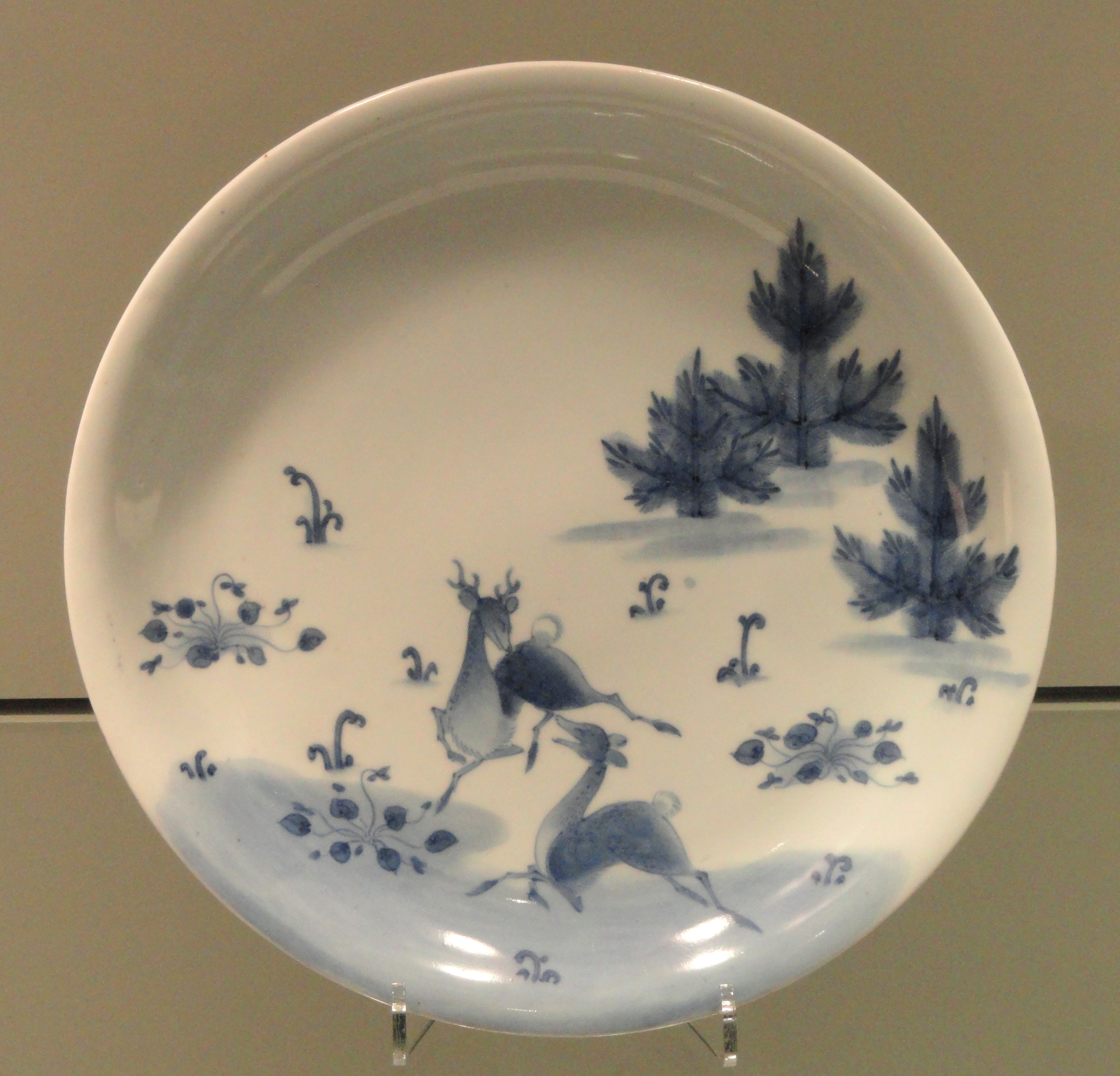
Dish with deer and pines, c. 1680–1700, and underglaze blue (cobalt)

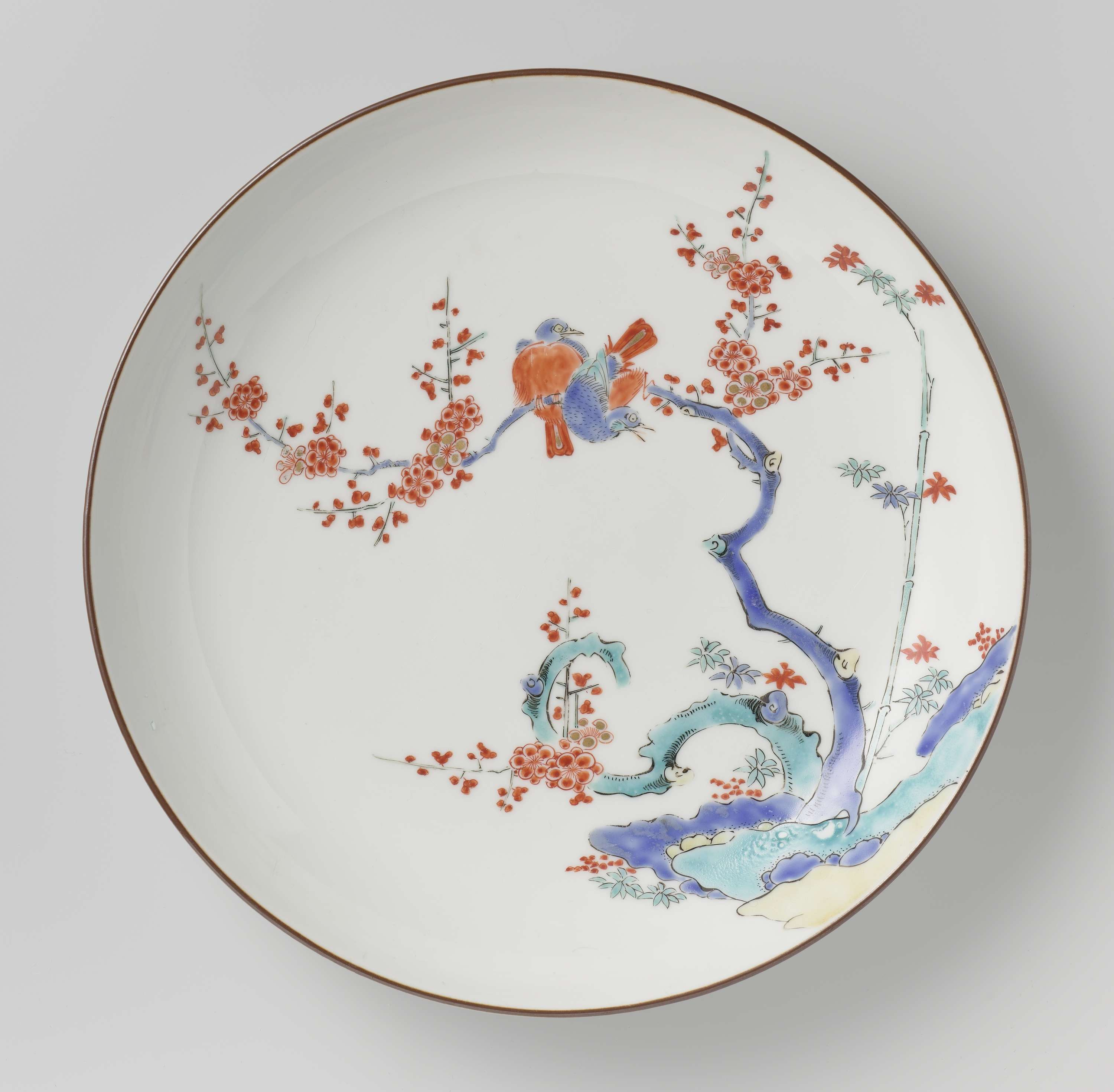
Dish with rocks, bamboo, prunus and birds, 17th century

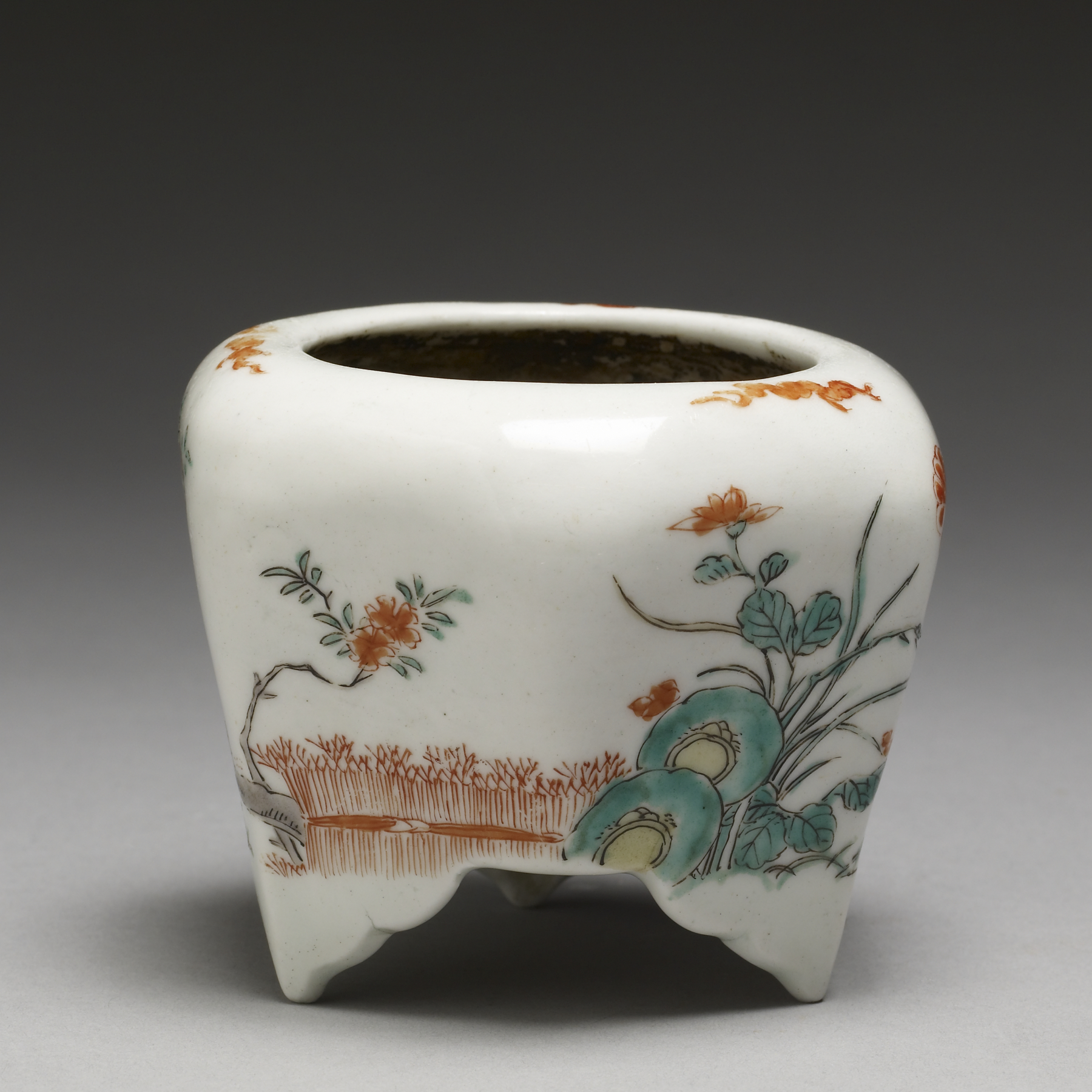
Incense burner (koro), porcelain with overglaze red, yellow, green black, purple, and gold enamels, 17th century

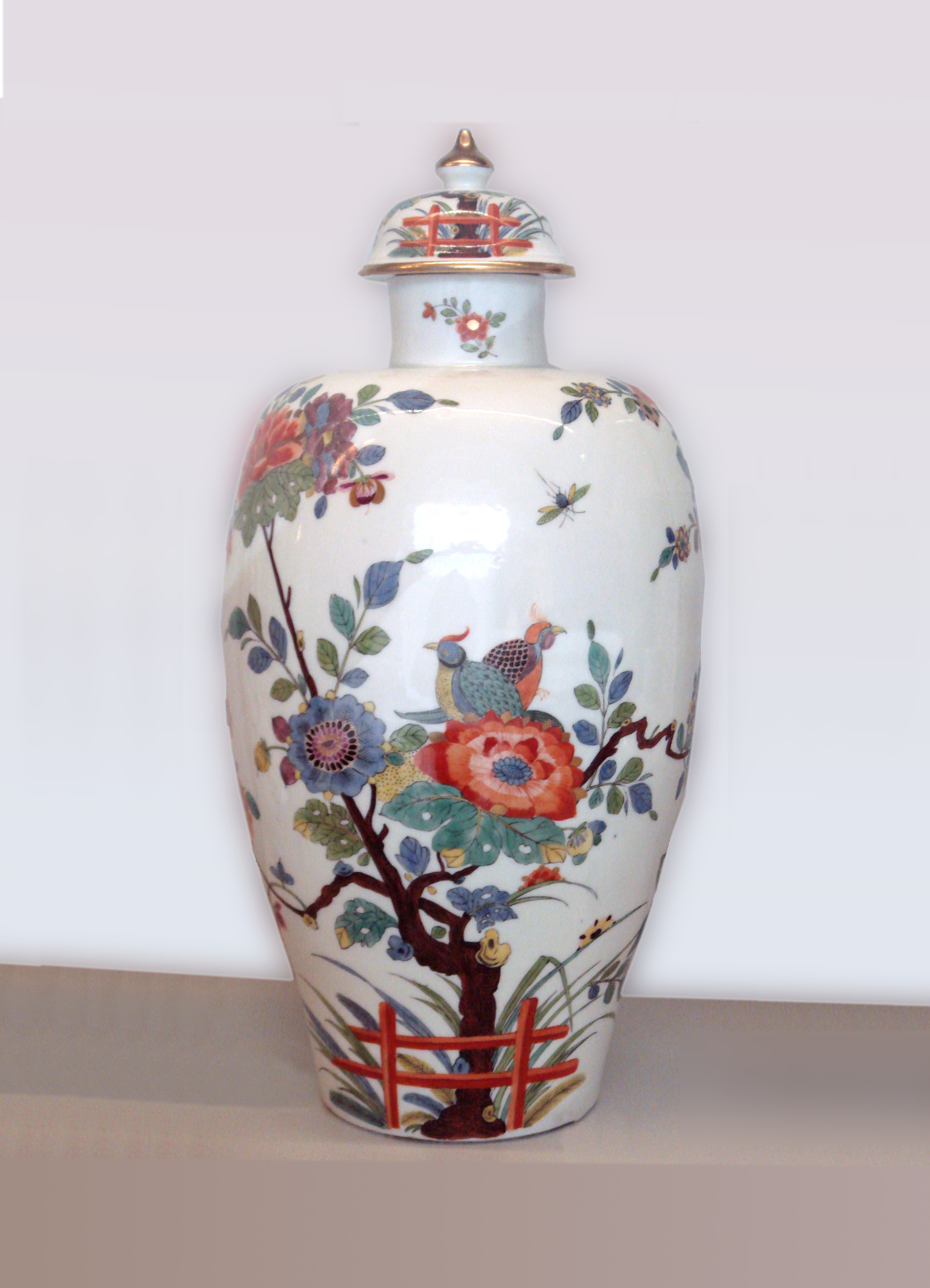
Meissen hard porcelain vase Indianische Blume ("Flowers of the Indies") design. 1735

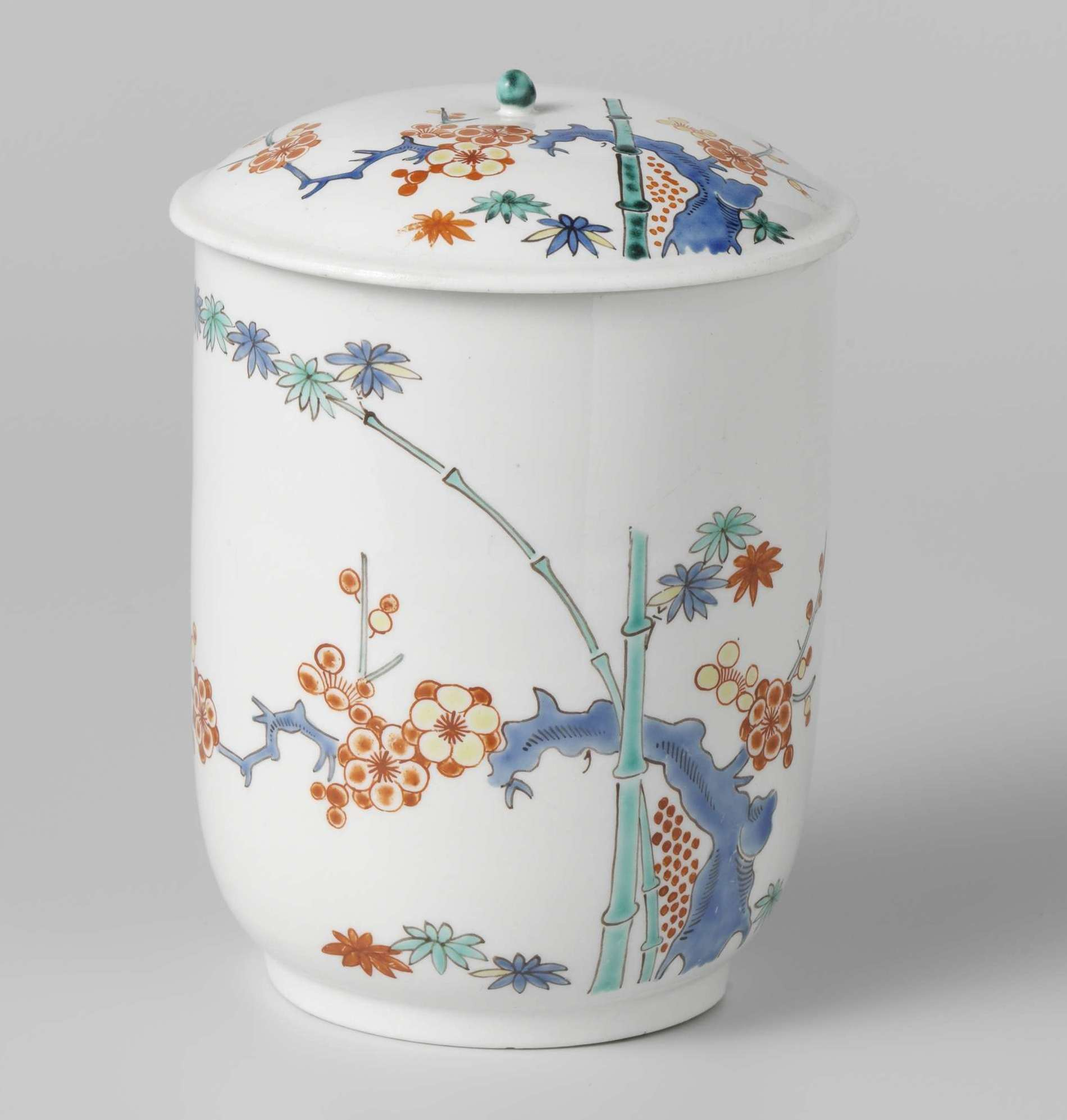
Chantilly porcelain pot, painted with bamboo and prunus and two birds. 1730–1735

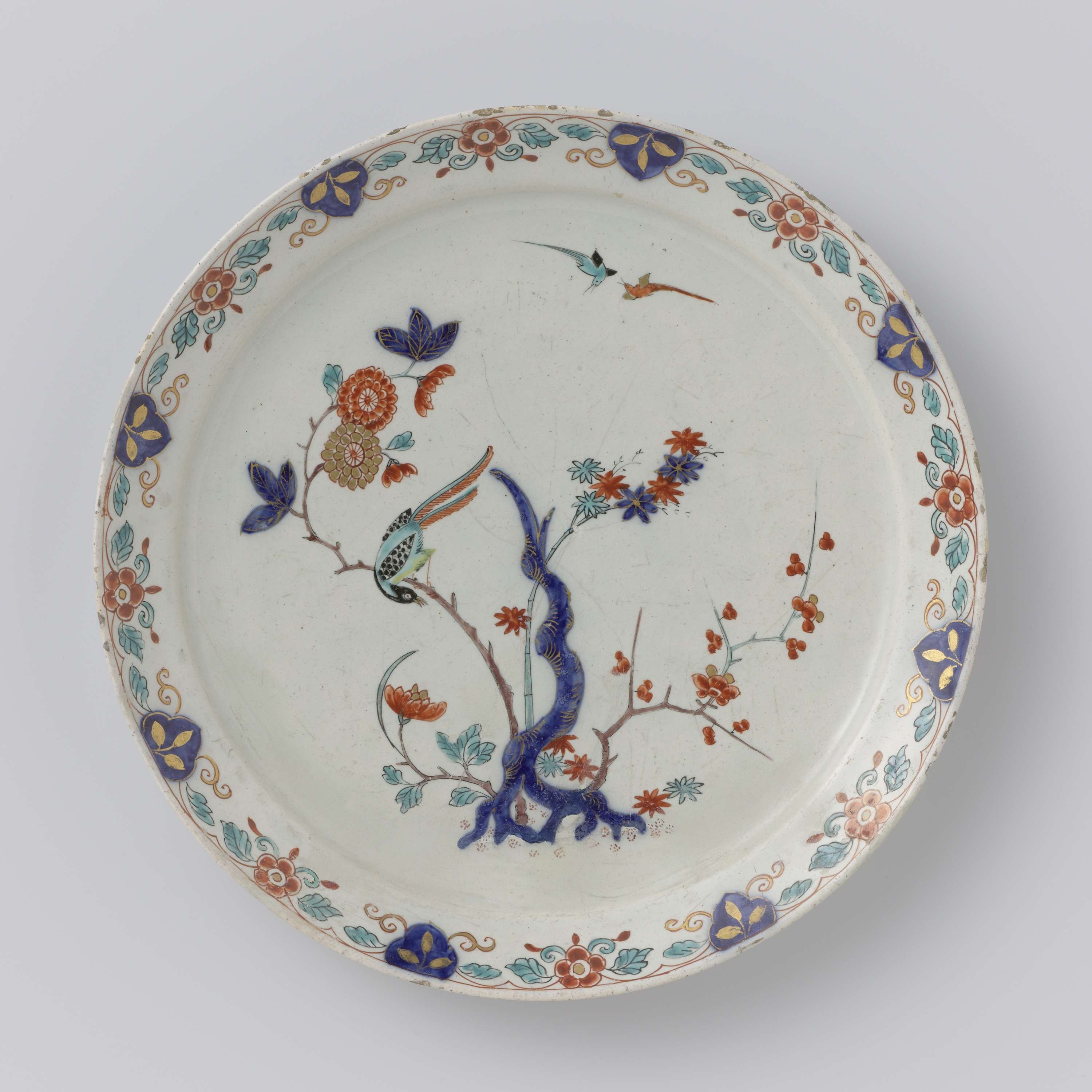
Dutch delftware (faience), after 1722

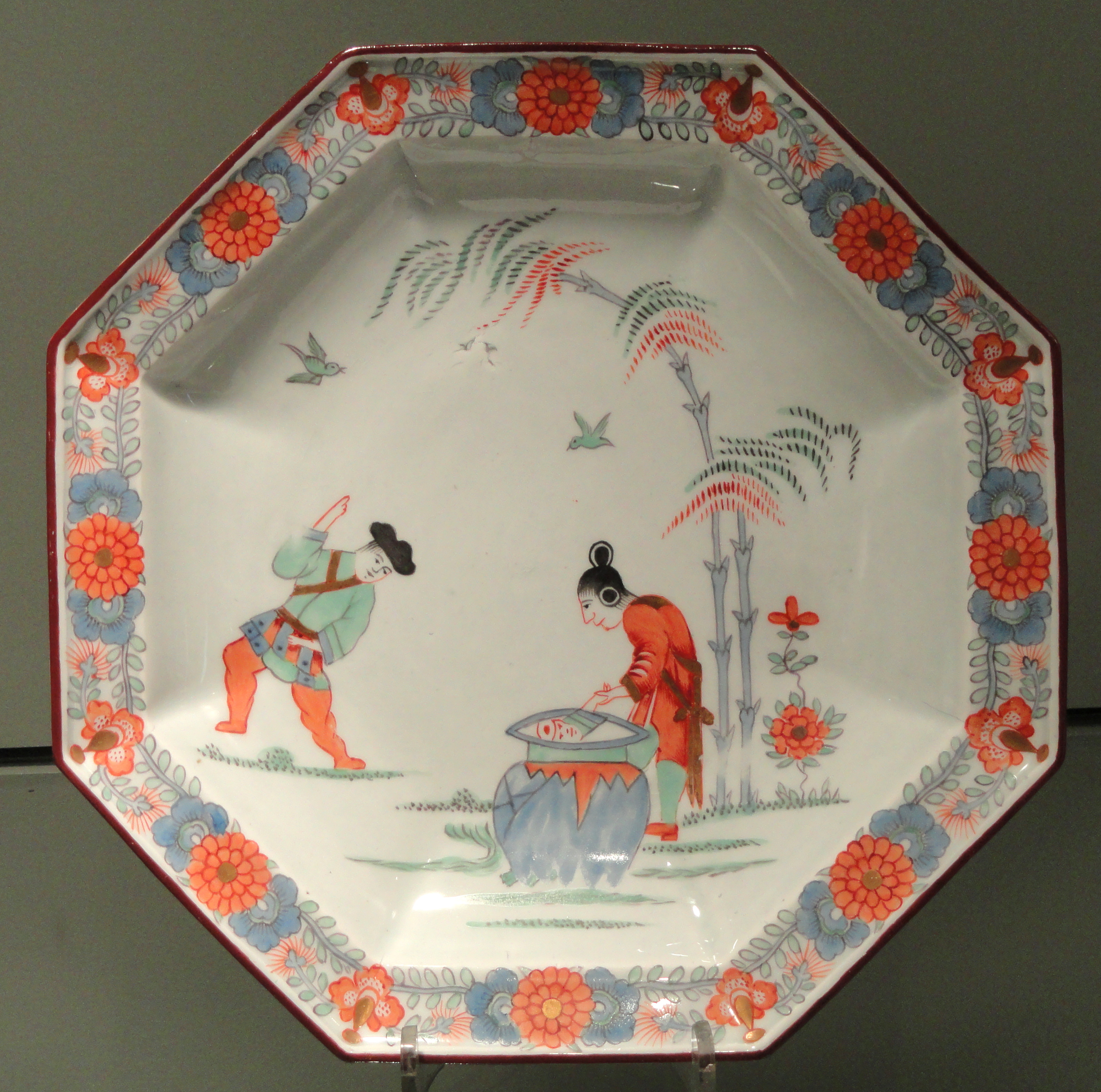
Du Paquier manufactory plate with shiba onko design, hard-paste porcelain with overglaze enamels. c. 1750

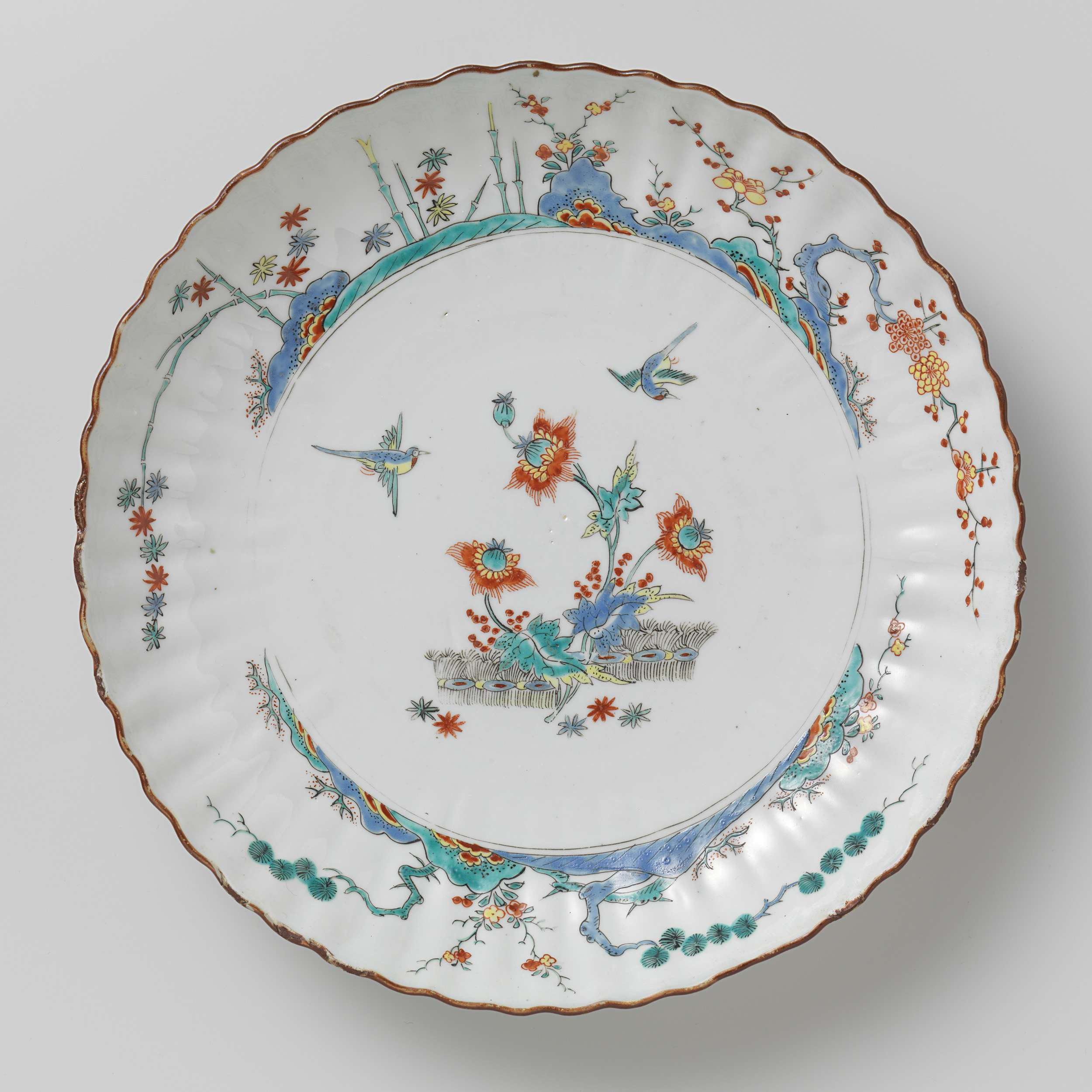
Chinese porcelain dish with ribbed edge, painted with bound hedges, bamboo blossoms and two flying birds on the mirror. 1700–c. 1750

== See also ==
- Chinese porcelain
- Intangible Cultural Properties of Japan
- List of Traditional Crafts of Japan
