= George Garner =

American singer

- Born: George Robert Garner III; April 16, 1892; Chicago, Illinois, United States
- Died: January 8, 1971 (aged 78); California, United States
- Occupations: singer, actor, musical director
- Spouse: Paullyn

George Garner (April 16, 1892 – January 8, 1971) was an American vocalist and choral director. He was the first African American to solo at the Chicago Symphony Orchestra. He was also the first African-American lead in a production at the Pasadena Playhouse in Pasadena, California.

== Selected credits ==
=== Theatre ===
Year	Production	Role	Theatre(s)	Notes
1934	Finder's Luck		Pasadena Playhouse	
