= Lucile Garner =

Canada's first flight attendant

Lucile Garner, later Lucile Garner Grant, (June 13, 1910 – March 4, 2013) was Canada's first flight attendant. In this capacity, she was the first woman to be employed by Trans-Canada Air Lines where she worked from 1938 to 1943.

Garner also designed TCA's first inflight uniform in 1938. At first, it was beige to match the airplane interior, and she was asked not to make it navy blue because pilots wore navy blue. However, the beige was widely disliked, so it became navy blues.

Garner was a trained nurse, which was part of her qualifications as a flight attendant. In her flight attendant duties, she monitored weather patterns, handled radio communications and created a menu for a transcontinental flight.

In 1941, Garner started a female flight attendant program at Yukon Southern Air Transport (later Canadian Pacific Airlines). She left the company the following year when she reached the retirement age 32.

In 1941, Garner married Norman Dennison, who died in 1955. She married Jack Grant in 1956. She was interviewed for the book Canadian Maple Wings Association: Flight Attendant History, published in 2005.
