= David Garner =

David Garner may refer to:

- David Garner (chemist) (born 1941), British chemist
- David Garner (artist) (born 1958), Welsh installation artist
- David McNiven Garner (1928–2016), New Zealand research physicist
- David Garner (composer) (born 1954), American composer
