= Peter M. Garner =

American abolitionist

Peter M. Garner (1809–1868) was an American abolitionist.

== Biography ==
Garner was born in Lancaster County, Pennsylvania on December 4, 1809; He moved to Fairview, Guernsey County, Ohio, with his parents, became a teacher, and was a pioneer in the anti-slavery movement in Ohio. In 1845, with two other citizens, he was seized by Virginians and taken to Parkersburg and thence to Richmond, and held in confinement six months, on a charge of assisting slaves to escape, but was finally released on his own recognizance. From 1847 till 1860 he taught in the Ohio penitentiary at Columbus, and during the war had charge of the military prisoners. He died in Columbus, Ohio on June 12, 1868.
