= Harry Garner =

Sir Harry Garner
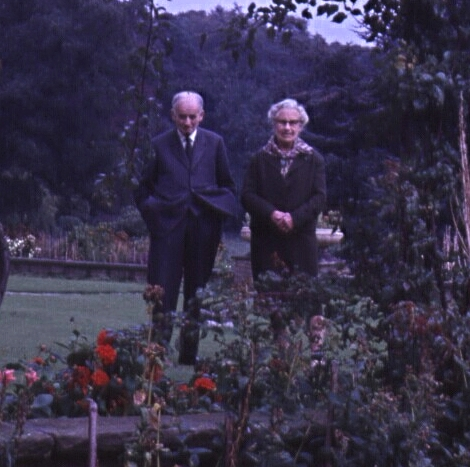
- Sir Harry and curator of the Sir Percival David Collection, Margaret Medley.
- Born: Harry Mason Garner; 3 November 1891; Hugglescote, Leicestershire, England
- Died: 7 August 1977; Camberley, Surrey, England
- Occupation: Scientist
- Employer: British government
- Known for: Expert of oriental art

Sir Harry Mason Garner KBE CB FRAeS (3 November 1891 – 7 August 1977) was a British aerodynamicist who was also notable as an expert on, and collector of, oriental ceramics.

== Biography ==
Garner was one of three boys and a daughter. His eldest brother, William Edward (1889–1960) was born in Hugglescote in Leicestershire and became an expert in explosives. His other brother Frederic Horace (1893–1964) became a chemistry professor. Harry was educated at Market Bosworth Grammar School and St John's College, Cambridge. He worked for the British government on aerodynamics leading a group at Felixstowe on marine aviation before becoming chief scientist at the Ministry of Supply.

Meanwhile, he became a noted expert and collector of oriental art. He started by collecting Chinese blue and white porcelain, and also wrote on Chinese lacquerware, especially carved lacquer, and published on these and other subjects. In 1954 he recognised the two vases now known as the David Vases as the only fourteenth century blue and white porcelain then known. Garner and his wife made donations of furniture. He was a friend of Sir Percival David. Both of these made substantial donations to the British Museum. Amongst Garner's collection were the Kakiemon elephants.

== Honours ==
Harry Garner was appointed CB in the King's Birthday Honours of 1948 and was knighted KBE in the New Year Honours of 1951. Sir Harry Garner was the last person knighted by King George VI. He was a Fellow of the Royal Aeronautical Society.
