= Alan Garner (disambiguation) =

Alan Garner (born 1934) is an English novelist.

Alan Garner may also refer to:

- Alan Garner (politician) (1929–1996), British politician
- Alan Garner (footballer) (1951–2020), English footballer
- Alan Garner, character in the film The Hangover
