= Martin Garner =

Martin Garner may refer to:

- Martin Garner (ornithologist), British ornithologist and Christian evangelist
- Martin Garner (actor), American film and television actor

== See also ==
- Marty Garner, American professional wrestler
