= Elvira Garner =

American writer

- Born: 1886
- Died: 1956 (aged 69–70)
- Occupations: Author and illustrator
- Known for: Ezekiel (1937); Sarah Faith Anderson: Her Book (1939); 'Way Down in Tennessee (1941)

Elvira Garner (1886–1956) was an early 20th-century author and watercolor illustrator in the US state of Florida.

== Biography ==
Garner lived in Sanford, Florida, and attended Rollins College in 1903 and 1904, but she wasn't able to graduate because of family responsibilities. Garner published five children's books, the first four of which she also illustrated: Ezekiel (1937), Ezekiel Travels (1938), Sarah Faith Anderson: Her Book (1939) and 'Way Down in Tennessee (1941). Her last book was Little Cat Lost (1943).

Ezekiel, her best-known children's book, won a prize from the Julia Ellsworth Ford Foundation, was published by Henry Holt in 1937, and detailed the story of a black boy who lived in Sanford, Florida with his Mammy, Pappy and sister Emancipation. As noted in a positive review in The New York Times, the book had an unusual format for the time, with "droll little sketches in color scattered lavishly through the printed pages as an integral part of the text" often forming the words of the story, itself. Ezekiel was advertised heavily with "display material in the form of window sets, sets of dolls illustrating the story and made -- by the author -- out of pipe cleaners, etc." The book is considered by Swann Galleries in an auction description as:

Emblematic of Florida when it was part of the Deep South, Ezekiel was written in African-American dialect, and was tremendously popular. But in the early days of the civil rights struggle, books like Little Black Sambo, and Ezekiel, as well as radio and television programs like Amos and Andy stereotyping African Americans were essentially "purged" from popular culture.

Garner, who was white, wrote in what she imagined was African-American dialect of the time. In the book with his name, Ezekiel said "Hits an ill wind dat blows nobody no good!"

Ezekiel's type was hand drawn, with illustrations inserted into the type.

In 1939, Sarah Faith Anderson: Her Book, was published, detailing life of a girl whose father was a missionary to the Seminoles in St. Augustine, Florida, and capturing the feeling of 19th-century Florida in words and illustrations. In 1941, she published 'Way Down in Tennessee.
