= John Garner =

John Garner may refer to:

- John Nance Garner (1868–1967), Vice President of the United States (1933–1941)
- John Garner (golfer) (born 1947), English golfer
- John Donald Garner (born 1931), British diplomat
- John T. Garner (1809–1888), soldier in the Texas Army during the Texas Revolution
