= Stanton Garner =

American scholar of drama and theater

Stanton B. Garner Jr. (born 1955) is an American scholar of drama, theater, and performance who specializes in modern and contemporary drama, theatre and performance theory, and medical humanities. A graduate of the Pennsylvania State University and Princeton University, he is currently James Douglas Bruce Professor of English and Theater at the University of Tennessee. With J. Ellen Gainor and Martin Puchner, he is co-editor of the Norton Anthology of Drama and The Shorter Norton Anthology of Drama (2009; 3rd ed. 2018) (W. W. Norton & Company).

His late father, Stanton Garner (1925 - 2011), was a scholar of nineteenth-century American literature.

== Publications ==
- Garner Jr., Stanton B. (2023). Theatre & Medicine. London: Methuen Drama. ISBN 9781350330153.
- Garner Jr., Stanton B. (2018). Kinesthetic Spectatorship in the Theatre: Phenomenology, Cognition, Movement. Basingstoke: Palgrave Macmillan. ISBN 9783319917931.
- Garner Jr., Stanton B. (1999). Trevor Griffiths: Politics, Drama, History. Ann Arbor: University of Michigan Press. ISBN 0472110659.
- Garner Jr., Stanton B. (1994). Bodied Spaces: Phenomenology and Performance in Contemporary Drama. Ithaca and London: Cornell University Press. ISBN 0801430399.
- Garner Jr., Stanton B. (1989). The Absent Voice: Narrative Comprehension in the Theater. Urbana and Chicago: University of Illinois Press. ISBN 0252016076.
