= Jeff Garner =

American fashion designer, film-maker, and visual artist

- Born: Jeffrey Brian Garner; August 18, 1978 (age 47); Franklin, Tennessee, U.S.
- Occupations: Fashion designer, visual artist, film-maker, Director

Jeffrey Brian "Jeff" Garner (born August 18, 1978) is an American fashion designer and film-maker known for his sustainable, plant-dyed red carpet gowns. His designs are sold online and in luxury boutiques across the United States, Canada, the United Kingdom, and China.

Garner's work has been featured at prestigious events such as the Academy Awards and on stage. He is best known for his commitment to sustainable fashion, with many of his garments produced in Tennessee using eco-friendly materials and traditional dyeing techniques. In 2012, he was recognized as part of the Smithsonian's Renwick Gallery 40 Under 40: Craft Futures exhibition, which highlighted emerging artists and designers redefining contemporary craft.

Garner draws inspiration from 19th-century dressmakers, particularly those from the American Civil War era who repurposed garments out of necessity, creating new designs from existing materials.

== Early life ==
Garner was born in the Civil War town of Franklin, Tennessee, to Don Garner, a business owner, and Peggy Lynn Garner, a homemaker. He was raised on a horse farm outside Nashville.

He attended David Lipscomb High School in Nashville before graduating from Pepperdine University in Malibu, California.

== Career ==
Garner worked in Los Angeles as a creative director for Stiletto Entertainment, collaborating with artists such as Barry Manilow, Fleetwood Mac, and Donna Summer. In 2000, to help fund his university studies, Garner was cast as the Mattel Blaine Barbie in national and international commercials produced by Mattel Toys.

In 2003, he returned to Nashville to establish Driven Clothing, a band merchandise and stage clothing line. He later founded Prophetik Clothing, an all-sustainable, eco-friendly fashion brand. Prophetik debuted at the Magic Fashion Trade Show in Las Vegas, securing retail distribution. Garner also participated in the Spring/Summer 2010 London Fashion Week in February 2010 at Vauxhall Fashion Scout. He received personal mentorships from designers Calvin Klein and J. Lindeberg.

Garner continued showcasing his collections at London Fashion Week, Canada Fashion Week, Paris Fashion week, Milan Fashion week, and Shanghai Fashion Week.

In July 2012, Garner was inducted into the Renwick Gallery. In February 2012, Grammy-winning artist Esperanza Spalding wore a Prophetik dress to the 84th Academy Awards, which was later featured on Vogue's website. In December 2013, Garner was inducted into the Costume & Textile Institute of the Tennessee State Museum.

Garner presented his sustainable collection "Nevermore" (Spring/Summer 2017) at both London and Shanghai Fashion Week, with the collection featured in Vogue.

== Awards ==
- Emmy Award for Remastered Prophetik (2018)

*'Let them be Naked' Feature Documentary Film awards:

- Winner | Changemaker Award | Winterland Impact Festival
- Winner | Best First Time Director, Documentary | Berlin Indie Film Festival
- Winner | Best First Time Director, Documentary | Cine Paris Film Festival
- Winner | Best Sustainable Fashion Film Award | London Fashion Film Festival
- Winner | Best Environmental Film | DOC LA
- Winner | Best Environmental Film | Terra Di Siena Film Festival
- Winner | First Feature Competition| World of Film International Film Festival
- Winner | Best Activism Feature | Tennessee Indie Independent Film Festival
- Nominee| Best Tennessee Feature | Nashville Film Festival
- Winner | Best Audience Award | NYC Justice Film Festival
- Winner | Best Documentary in Art & Nature | Master of Art Film Festival (Sofia)
- Winner | Best Documentary Film Award | Toronto Pendance Film Festival
