= Tyrone Garner (disambiguation) =

Tyrone Garner (born 1978) is a Canadian professional ice hockey player.

Tyrone Garner may also refer to:

- Tyrone Garner (politician) (born 1968/69), Kansas politician
- Tyrone Garner (1967–2006), plaintiff in Lawrence v. Texas
