= Bill Garner =

Bill Garner may refer to:

- Bill Garner (footballer) (born 1947), English football player
- Bill Garner (basketball) (born 1940), American basketball player

== See also ==
- William Garner (disambiguation)
