= Craig Garner =

New Zealand cricketer (born 1971)

Craig Donald Garner (born 12 July 1971 in Porirua, New Zealand) is a former New Zealand cricketer who played ten first-class matches for the Central Districts Stags in the 1990s and he also played for Nelson in the Hawke Cup.
