= Kathy Garner =

Florida judge

Kathy L. Garner
- Born: 1959 (age 66–67)
- Education: Florida A&M University (BA); Florida State University (PhD)
- Occupations: Judge of Gadsden County, Florida

Kathy L. Garner (born 1959) is a judge for Gadsden County, Florida, and is the county's first black female judge. She has been noted for her work with juvenile cases in the county, and has been credited with helping reduce the number of juvenile arrests and re-offenders.

== Biography ==
Kathy L. Garner grew up in Quincy, Florida, and her father was the mayor Pro Tem of Quincy. She attended the Gadsden County Public School System. She received her bachelor's degree from Florida A&M University in criminal justice. She received her Juris Doctor (JD) from the Florida State University College of Law.

From 1981 to 1985, she worked at the Florida Commission on Human Relations. From 1985 to 1987, she worked for the Florida Department of General Services. From 1987 to 1992, Gardener worked for the Florida Department of Transportation as an investigator. Garner was the sole practitioner for the Garner Law Group which was started in 2000. From 2004 to 2006, Garner was a practitioner for the law group of Barnes, Garner and Rayne. Garner served as a child support hearing officer for the 2nd Judicial Circuit between 2004 and 2009.

=== Judge of Gadsden County ===
Governor Charlie Crist appointed Garner as judge for the Gadsden County Court in October 2009 after Judge Stewart E. Parsons retired. She is the first black female judge in Gadsden County and was sworn in to her position in December 2009. She was reelected to the seat in 2012, defeating opponents Francis Allman Jr. and Marva A. Davis, with more than 57% of the vote.

Garner was noted in 2016 by The New York Times for her work with juveniles and preventing recidivism in Gadsden County. She regularly speaks to students to encourage them to "stand your ground" against negative influences, and to do good in the world. She was honored as a woman of distinction by the Girl Scout Council in 2017.
