= Mary Field Garner =

- Born: February 1, 1836; Stanley, England
- Died: July 20, 1943 (aged 107); Ogden, Utah, United States
- Spouse: William Garner
- Children: 10

Mary Field Garner (February 1, 1836 – July 20, 1943) was an immigrant to the United States from England. She was a member of the Church of Jesus Christ of Latter-day Saints (LDS Church) and a Mormon pioneer.

== Early life ==
Mary Field was born February 1, 1836 in Stanley Hill, Herefordshire, England, to William and Mary Harding Field. She was one of their eight children. Her parents were converted to the Church of Jesus Christ of Latter Day Saints after hearing Wilford Woodruff speak as a missionary. They were baptized in 1840. Her family moved to the United States after their conversion in order to congregate with the main body of members of the church in Nauvoo, Illinois.

Once the family had enough money, they sailed to America. On their journey, there were storms and rough seas. Garner recorded that the trip took seven weeks and she was seasick for most of that time. They arrived in Nauvoo, and her family rented a house because they could not afford to build their own. Her father also died while the family was living there. She met Joseph Smith and other early church leaders. She records that she had long red, curly hair. When she was eight, Garner attended Smith's funeral after he was martyred. She was also present at the meeting after Smith's death in which Brigham Young appeared and sounded like Smith.

== Pioneer ==
In 1846, the members of the church in Nauvoo were driven out of Illinois by anti-Mormon mobs. Garner recorded that in September 1846, a mob of 2000 men came to Nauvoo. A group of about 400 Latter Day Saints, including her brother, fought them off for three days until they surrendered the city to the mob. After the mob attack, Garner's family left the city for some time. They were informed later by the mob, however, that they could return to Nauvoo. They did so, crossing the Mississippi River when it was iced over. They lived in a double house with the Lee family. Garner witnessed the burning of the Nauvoo Temple by another mob in 1848. Her family later rented a house from a Mrs. Kimball. Garner met one of Kimball's friends, Mrs. Holridge, and lived with her in Burlington, Iowa, for about three years. The rest of Garner's family eventually joined her as they traveled towards the Salt Lake Valley.

Garner's family moved to Council Bluffs, Iowa, where she met her future husband, William Garner Jr. She lived there for two seasons, as she recorded in her autobiography. In 1850, she migrated to Utah with her family. She records that on their journey, she was bothered by Native Americans who wanted to take her with them. She tells of the strict rations that were placed on their food. On their journey, many talked about the lives they had left behind in Nauvoo and the persecution of the saints there. She even helped drive a team of oxen across the plains. For the majority of their trek, she walked because there wasn't space in the wagon. They settled in Weber County, Utah. They arrived at Emigration Canyon, Utah, at night. On their first morning it snowed, but they were welcomed by the saints in the area with a hot breakfast.

In her autobiography she records that the crops of 1854 and of 1855 failed due to grasshoppers and droughts. However, the saints were willing to share their food and other goods with one another and survived. An Indian Chief even followed her home on one occasion and proposed marriage, but she refused. The family lived for some time in Slaterville, Utah, where Garner became reacquainted with William, whose father was one of the first converts to the church in England.

She married William Garner Jr. on November 1, 1856. William was a farmer and was called on a mission for the church in 1882. The couple had ten children. In 1857, Garner recorded that she saw Johnston's Army pass through Utah. She and William had five children in Slaterville, and then they moved to Hooper, Utah, where her other five children were born.

Garner was an active member of the LDS Church throughout her life. She served as a Relief Society leader in her ward and participated in many other church activities. She continued to share her belief in the Church with others.

== Later life ==
Garner's husband died in 1915. For some time she lived with her daughter-in-law, but was active and could take care of herself until she fell and broke her right hip. Even at an old age, she did not wear glasses and was in good health. She had only seen a doctor once in her life before her fall. Garner died on July 20, 1943, in Hooper. At the time of her death, she was the oldest Utah resident and the eldest member of the church. She was also the last living acquaintance of Joseph Smith. She left behind over 600 lineal descendants, and four of her children were still living when she died.
