= Arrest of Karen Garner =

2020 violent arrest of an elderly woman in Loveland, Colorado, U.S.

- Date: June 26, 2020
- Location: Loveland, Colorado, United States; 40°24′15.4″N 105°02′20.5″W

On June 26, 2020, Karen Garner, a 73-year-old woman with dementia and sensory aphasia, suffered a broken arm, dislocated shoulder, and other injuries while being violently arrested by police in Loveland, Colorado, who had been summoned by Walmart employees after Garner left the store without paying for $13.88 worth of merchandise. Surveillance video from the police station taken after the arrest shows officers laughing, mocking Garner, and exchanging fist bumps while watching their own body camera footage of her injury and arrest.

A lawsuit, filed in April 2021, alleges that the officers used excessive force and failed to provide Garner with timely medical attention. After body camera footage of the arrest and surveillance footage of the officers celebrating circulated widely that same month, three officers resigned and one went on leave pending investigations by city, county, and federal officials. On May 19, the arresting officer, Austin Hopp, was charged with second-degree assault, attempt to influence a public servant, and official misconduct. A second officer on the scene, Daria Jalali, was charged with failure to intervene, failure to report the use of excessive force, and official misconduct.

Karen Garner died from complications from dementia in November 2023.

== Arrest ==
External videos
- Store surveillance video and police bodycam footage

On June 26, 2020, Karen Garner, a 73-year-old woman with dementia and sensory aphasia, left a Walmart in Loveland, Colorado, allegedly without paying for cleaning supplies, a T-shirt, candy, and soda worth $13.88. Walmart employees followed Garner outside, took back the items, and refused to allow her to pay for them. After the employees took the items back from her, Garner began walking home. Walmart stated the employees then called the police because Garner pulled off an employee's facemask.

Minutes later Austin Hopp, a first-year officer with the Loveland Police Department, found Garner picking wildflowers in a field alongside the road. Hopp moved aggressively to arrest Garner, who appeared confused and frightened and continued walking with her hands in the air gripping the flowers. Within seconds Hopp grabbed Garner's arms, pulled them backwards, and handcuffed her. Garner, who weighed 80 pounds (36 kilograms), repeatedly said "I am going home" as Hopp forced her to the ground over and over.

A second officer, Daria Jalali, a third-year officer, arrived and helped Hopp hold Garner against the hood of a police vehicle while pulling her handcuffed arms. Eventually, the officers hogtied Garner and forced her into the vehicle. When a bystander asked them, "Do you have to use that much aggression?", one of the officers replied, "What are you doing? Get out of here. This is not your business."

Garner's family and her attorney allege that officers fractured Garner's arm, dislocated her shoulder, sprained her wrist, and covered her body in bruises, then failed to provide her with medical care until six hours after her arrest. They also say that Garner lost most of the use of her left arm and required assistance with activities such as showering and dressing.

== Immediate aftermath ==
External videos
- Police station surveillance video showing officers watching bodycam footage of arrest

After taking Garner to the police station, Hopp, Jalali, and Community Service Officer Tyler Blackett (who transported and booked Garner) were recorded by a police station surveillance camera laughing and joking while watching footage of the arrest from Hopp's body camera, while Garner was handcuffed to a nearby bench. Jalali is heard to say, "Bodycams are my favorite thing to watch. I could watch livestream bodycams all day." Hopp and Jalali exchanged a fist bump when discussing how the arrest went; Hopp said that the arrest "went great" and "we crushed it".

Hopp is also heard saying that he did not give Garner a Miranda warning and referring to Garner as "ancient" and "senile and stuff". He also said Garner was "flexible", and that he was "proud" and "super excited" because Garner was the first person he had hogtied with a hobble (a restraint used to bind a person's legs and sometimes arms as well). He also said "I was like, 'All right, let's wrestle, girl. Let's wreck it!' I got her on the ground and all that stuff. I got her cuffed up ... threw her on the ground a couple of times ... I can't believe I threw a 73-year-old on the ground."

He also described dislocating Garner's shoulder: "I was pushing, pushing, pushing. I hear – pop. I was like 'Oh no.'" As that moment approached in the video they were watching, Hopp said to the others, "Ready for the pop?" and "Hear the pop?" When an officer asked Hopp what made the sound, he replied "I think it was her shoulder." Jalali said "I hate this" and pulled her hat over her eyes, while Blackett said, "I love it." While watching the portion of the bodycam video where an officer tried to order the bystander to leave, Hopp and Blackett also exchanged a fist bump.

== Lawsuit and investigations ==
A federal lawsuit filed April 14, 2021, names the City of Loveland, Hopp, Jalali, Blackett, Master Sergeant Phil Metzler (who was the supervisor on the scene) and Sergeant Antolina Hill (who approved the officers' paperwork) as defendants, and alleged that police used excessive force, failed to provide Garner with medical care, and violated the Americans with Disabilities Act. Hopp was put on administrative leave while the police department investigated, and Jalali and Metzler were given administrative duties.

After filing the suit, Garner's attorneys uploaded bodycam footage of the arrest to YouTube, prompting a public outcry. (Note: Fleskes, Austin (April 15, 2021). "Loveland police face federal civil rights lawsuit over arrest of 73-year-old woman". The Denver Post.) The Colorado 8th Judicial District Attorney's Office announced it would investigate the incident, along with Fort Collins Police Services, along with the United States Attorney for the District of Colorado and the Federal Bureau of Investigation.

On April 26, Garner's attorney uploaded the police station surveillance video footage of the laughing officers to YouTube. The footage further outraged the public. On April 28, Jalali, Blackett, and Metzler were also placed on administrative leave, and on April 30 it was announced that Hopp, Jalali, and Blackett had resigned.

On May 19, Hopp was charged by state prosecutors with assault causing serious bodily injury (second-degree assault), attempt to influence a public servant, and official misconduct. Jalali was charged with failure to report use of force, failure to intervene, and official misconduct. On May 20, 2021, Hopp and Jalali turned themselves in; they were released that same day after posting bond.

On September 8, 2021, it was announced that Garner's civil lawsuit had been settled with the City of Loveland for $3,000,000. Later in September 2021, Sergeant Metzler resigned.

On November 18, 2021, Hopp pleaded not guilty to the three charges against him, and a trial date was set for April 18, 2022.

On May 5, 2022, Hopp was sentenced to five years in prison as part of a plea agreement to lessen his jail time. His plea agreement avoided the minimum 10 to 30 or more years in prison he would have faced with a trial and conviction.

On August 5, 2022, Jalali was sentenced to 45 days in prison and 3 years probation for her actions, which the presiding judge described as “incomprehensible”. Jalali, 28, appeared before 8th Judicial District Court Judge Joshua Lehman to be sentenced for failure to intervene in the use of excessive force, a class 1 misdemeanor. She pleaded guilty to that charge in late June.
