= Joe Garner (author) =

- Born: Macomb, Illinois
- Occupations: Author; Radio executive

Joe Garner is a former radio executive (Westwood One Radio Networks), American author, and keynote speaker who resides in Los Angeles.

== Career ==
Garner spent twenty years working in the radio industry, over ten of those years of which he was employed as an executive with the Westwood One radio network. He contributed to the creation and production of numerous audiobooks for Simon & Schuster. He presides over an entertainment production company, Joe Garner Enterprises, in Los Angeles.

Garner has become an author of historical books, both traditional and multimedia. With his book We Interrupt This Broadcast, he combined storytelling and history describe landmark events. His pairing of broadcast audio with photographs and the written word attained the New York Times Bestseller List in two consecutive years. A 10th anniversary, fourth edition featuring new stories and a new Afterword from NBC's Brian Williams, was released in October 2008. He has documented events in sports with And the Crowd Goes Wild (1999) and And the Fans Roared (2000). He chronicled Notre Dame's football history with Echoes of Notre Dame Football: Great and Memorable Moments of the Fighting Irish (2001). Garner compiled television history in Stay Tuned: Television’s Unforgettable Moments (2002). He has honored Hollywood films with Now Showing: Unforgettable Moments From the Movies (2003); has chronicled the history of 20th century comedy with Made You Laugh: The Funniest Moments in Comedy (2004); and captured the milestone moments in NASCAR history in Speed, Guts & Glory (2007). 100 Yards of Glory, is a book and video documentary about NFL history, his fourth publication with Bob Costas, published by Houghton Mifflin Harcourt. It became a New York Times and USA Today bestseller in January 2012. His most recent work written in collaboration with Michael Ashley was released October 23, 2018 titled It's Saturday Morning!: Celebrating the Golden Era of Cartoons 1960s-1990s (2018) detailing the Saturday Morning cartoons many of us grew up with through the 60's, 70's, 80's and 90's.

In addition to Costas, Garner has collaborated with Dustin Hoffman, Bill Kurtis, Carl and Rob Reiner, Regis Philbin, NASCAR champion Jeff Gordon, Dick Van Dyke, Walter Cronkite, and NBC anchor Brian Williams.
