= Sakaida Kakiemon =

- 酒井田柿右衛門
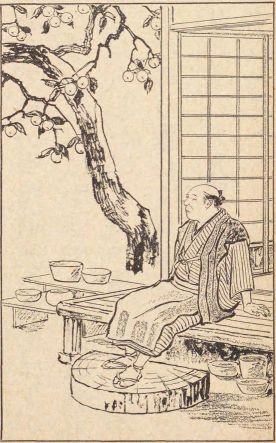
- Born: 1596
- Died: 1666 (aged 69–70)
- Occupation: Potter

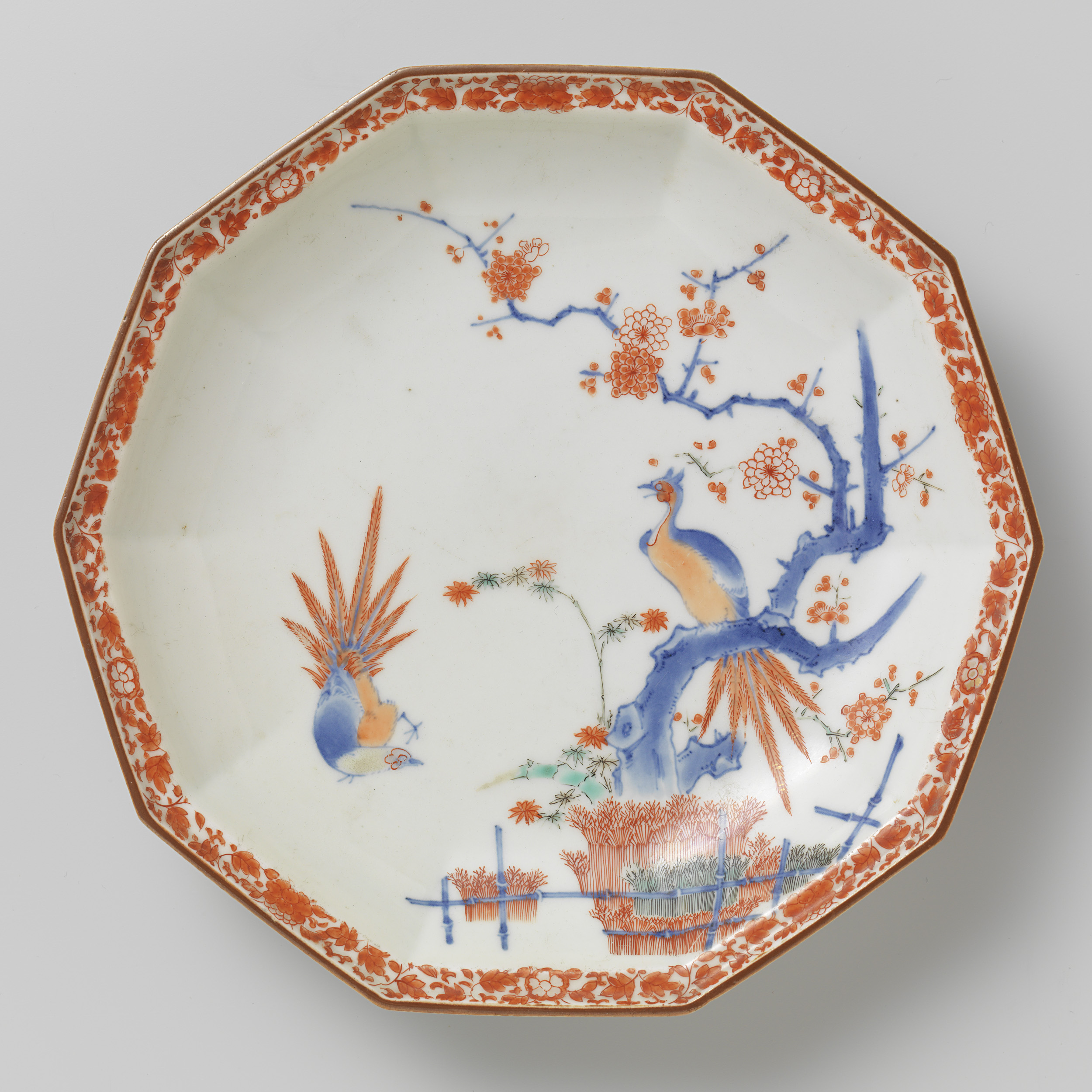
Kakiemon plate, 1680-1700

Sakaida Kakiemon (Japanese: 酒井田柿右衛門), or Sakaida Kizaemon (1596 — 1666) was a Japanese potter who invented the style known after him as Kakiemon. He worked in association with Higashijima Tokue, and created the first enamelled porcelain in Japan.

== Biography ==
Sakaida Kakiemon started his porcelain business following the fall of the Ming dynasty in China and the succeeding disruption of traditional Chinese porcelain exports to Europe. Sakaida Kakiemon is said to have learned the enamel porcelain technique from a Chinese artisan in Nagasaki in 1643. He was the first in Japan to practice overglaze enameling (applying enamel on top of the glazing), a technique developed in China during the Kangxi era of the Qing dynasty. He also refined the method for producing a translucent white glaze, known as nigoshide. In the Arita dialect, nigoshi describes the water used to wash rice, thereby referring to the translucent white of nigoshide. In comparison with other Arita ware, which tends to have a bluish tinge, nigoshide has virtually no bluish cast.

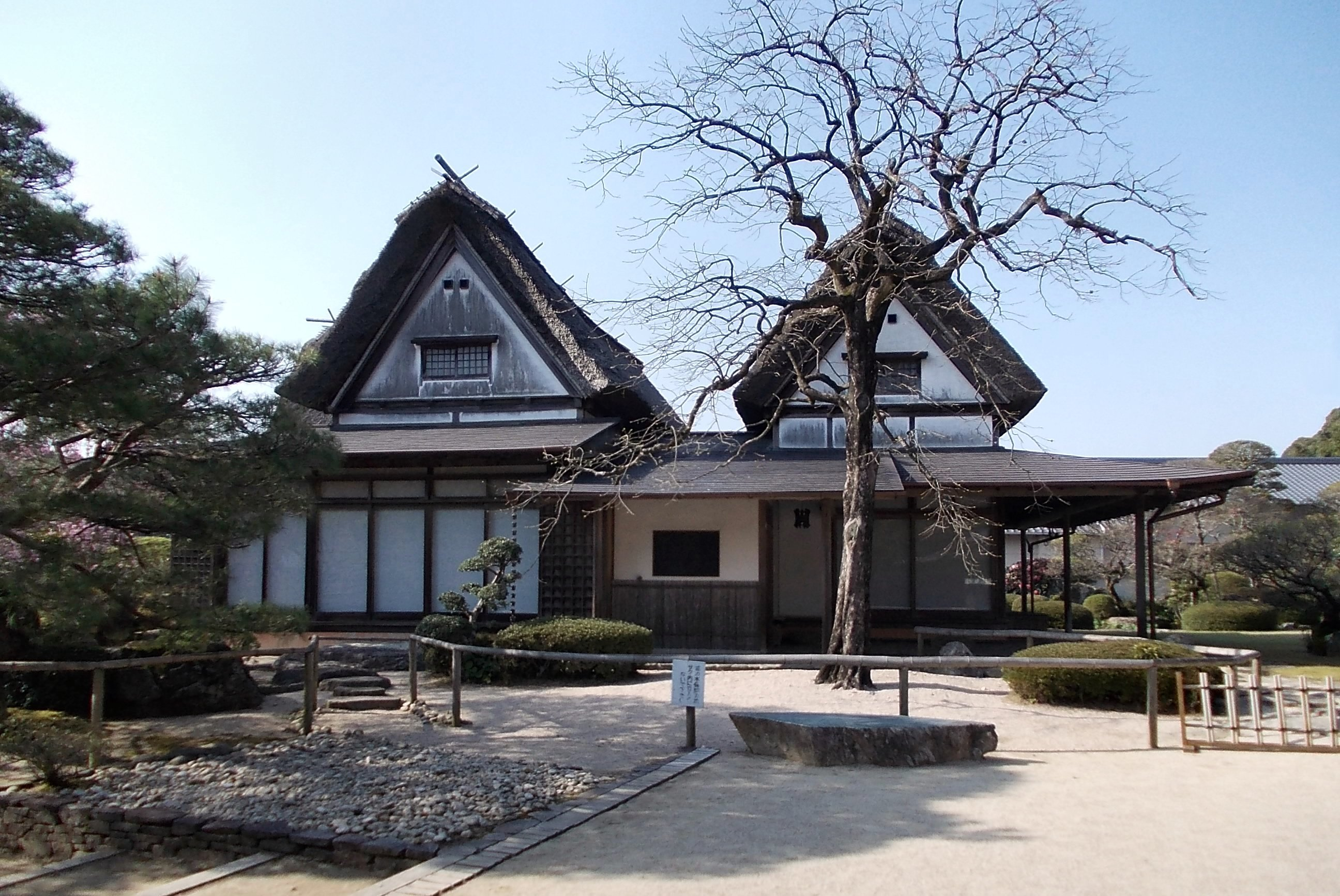
Kakiemon kiln site in Arita

The first pieces were produced in 1643, with Chinese pigments. They are also called ko-Imari, as they were shipped to Europe through the harbour of Imari. Kakiemon ware was extensively exported to Europe by the Dutch, until the Chinese industry was reestablished with the stabilization of the Qing dynasty, and the Dutch then shifted their orders to China, which started to manufacture imitations of the Japanese ware, known as "Chinese Imari".

Sakaida Kakiemon's work is said to have been the probable inspiration for Chantilly and Meissen porcelains. The most important European collections are in Hampton Court in London, and in the Zwinger in Dresden.

== Successors ==
The Kakiemon productions almost disappeared by the end of the 18th century, but were revived in the 20th century by his descendants. A contributing factor was the extremely low percentage of achieving perfect results with nigoshide. This was due to risk of cracking from the differing contraction rates of its composite elements, namely, powdered porcelain stone from Izumiyama mountain, clay from Shirakawayama, and stone from Iwayagawachi. The main heir of the family always takes on the name Kakiemon. Sakaida Kakiemon XIV (1934-2013) became a Living National Treasure. The current head Sakaida Kakiemon XV is his son and works at the family kiln in Arita, Saga Prefecture.
