= Ciquaire Cirou =

French industrialist and porcelain manufacturer

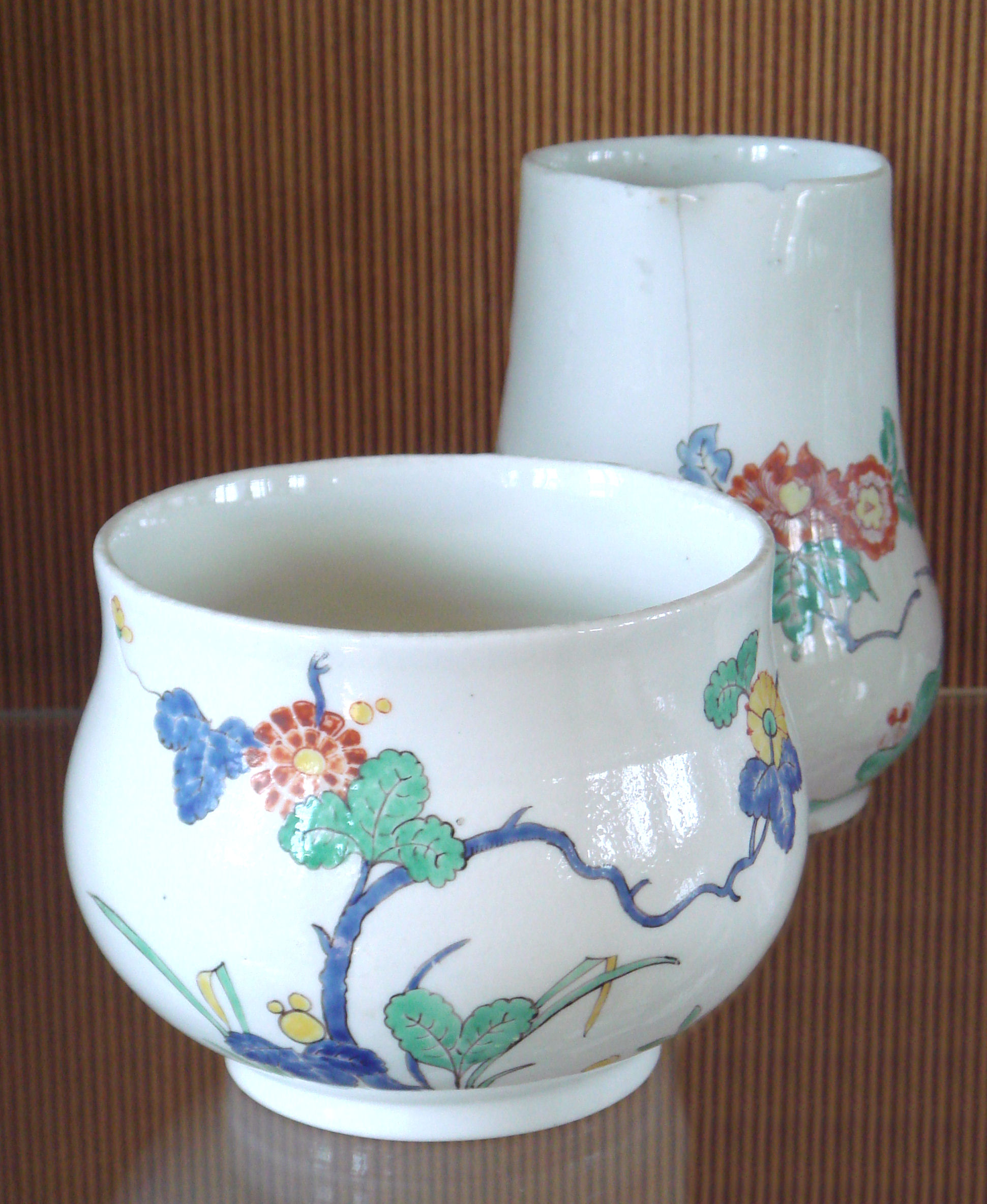
Chantilly porcelain sugar bowl, Japanese Kakiemon style, made under Ciquaire Cirou, 1725–1751

Ciquaire Cirou (c. 1700–1751) was a French industrialist and porcelain manufacturer. He was originally a member of the Saint-Cloud manufactory, where he was a painter, specializing in soft-paste porcelain.

By a letter dated 5 October 1735, Louis XV (reg 1715–1774) allowed Ciquaire Cirou to make porcelain "in imitation of Japanese porcelain" for 20 years. The Chantilly manufactory itself had already been established since c.1725 however.

Ciquaire Cirou thus became the director of the Chantilly manufactory until his death, under the protection of Louis Henri, Duke of Bourbon.

Through his tenure, the style of the Chantilly manufactory, described as the "First period" (1725–1751), almost entirely focused on imitations of Chinese and Japanese wares, such as the Kakiemon style.

== See also ==
- French porcelain
