= Chantilly porcelain =

French soft-paste porcelain

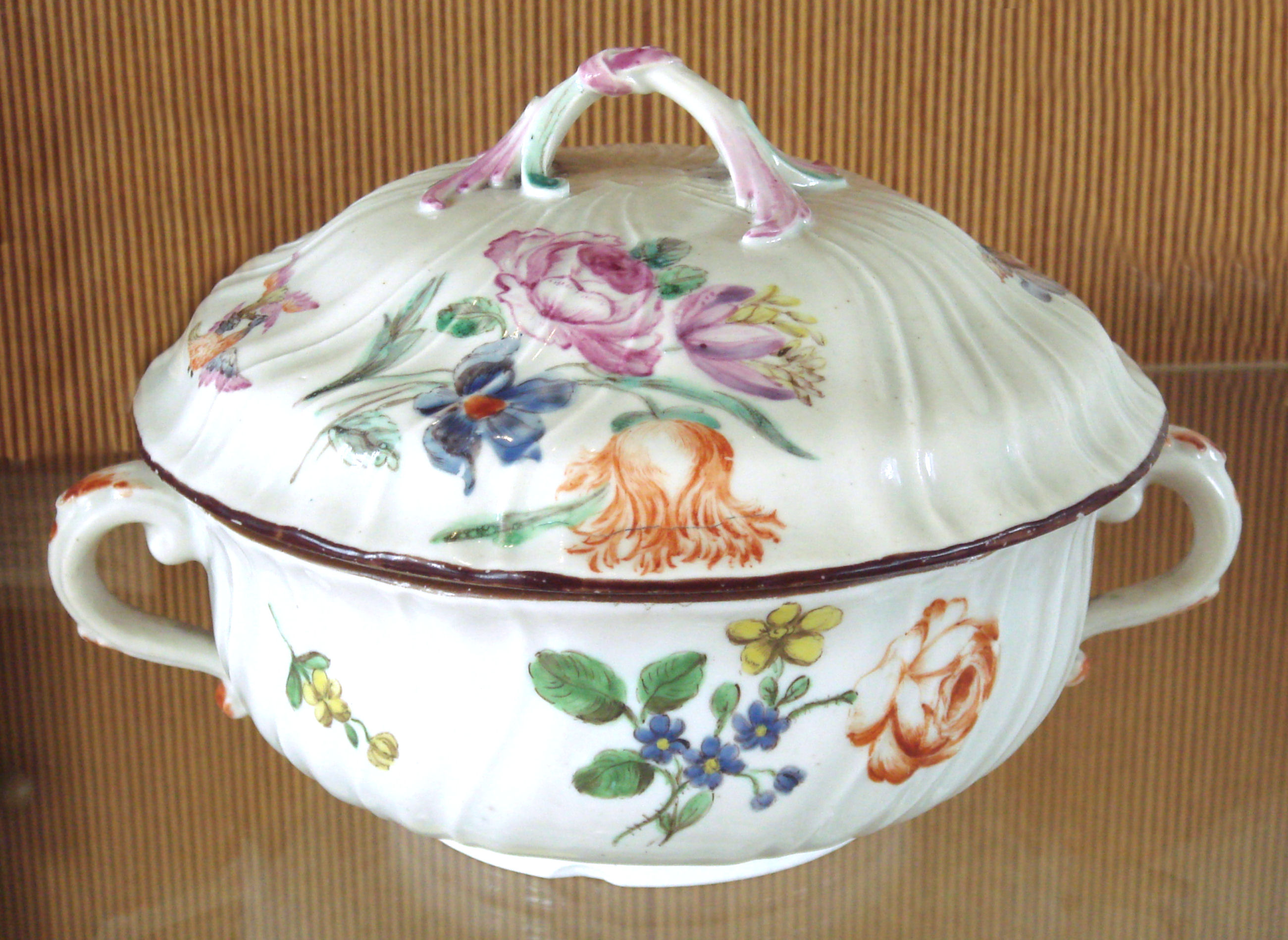
Chantilly soft-paste porcelain bowl, intermediate period, 1750–1760

Chantilly porcelain is French soft-paste porcelain produced between 1730 and 1800 by the manufactory of Chantilly in Oise, France. The wares are usually divided into three periods, 1730–1751, 1751–1760, and a gradual decline from 1760 to 1800.

The factory made table and tea wares, small vases, and some figures, these all of Orientals.

== Foundation ==
Outbuildings were purchased in March 1730 on the banks of the small river Nonette near the extensive park of his château de Chantilly by Louis Henri de Bourbon, prince de Condé, the prince of the blood exiled from Court, who founded the factory. At this period, the capital investment required for establishing a porcelain manufactory was so extensive that a royal or aristocratic patron was essential; only in Britain was early porcelain manufacture capitalized by the merchant class. The elite wares of Chantilly were intended to compete with Saint-Cloud porcelain, a pioneer among French soft-paste porcelain manufactures, and other small manufactures at Mennecy, under the protection of the duc de Villeroy, as well as with imported Meissen porcelain and Chinese porcelains.

Like the other French factories of this period, and unlike the "Saxon" hard-paste porcelain produced at Meissen, kaolin was not amongst the raw materials of the Chantilly body.

== First period: Chinese and Japanese designs (1725–1751) ==
Condé was an avid collector of East Asian porcelains, both Chinese and Japanese, and his Chantilly manufactory's first decade of output showed the marked influence of Arita porcelain, particularly in the "Kakiemon" palette of soft iron red and blue-green, seen in the tea pot at left.

Decorative vases and figurines (or magots) for the chimneypiece were produced, and useful wares included delicately modelled rococo tea-pots and cream jugs, coffee-sets or cabarets complete with their trays, covered tureens, bourdaloues, plates and cups, down to porcelain flowers to incorporate in chandeliers and knife-handles.

A patent granted to the factory in 1735 by Louis XV specifically describes the right to make porcelain façon de Japon, "in imitation of the porcelain of Japan;" its reference to ten years' successful experiment on the part of Ciquaire Cirou (c. 1700–1751) is the basis for dating the factory's origins to 1725, found in many sources.

At first the body of the ware was covered with an opaque tin-glaze like that used for faience, providing a clean white ground for the sparse decors in enamel colors. Later a slightly yellowish clear lead glaze was employed.

The prince de Condé died in 1740, after which the factory was forced to support itself, and reduced its ambitions. The manager of the factory, until his death in 1751, remained Ciquaire Cirou; under his care Chantilly produced its most characteristic porcelains, which were so valued by collectors in the 19th century that many successful fakes were produced by makers such as Edme Samson, reproducing the famous underglaze factory mark of a hunting horn.

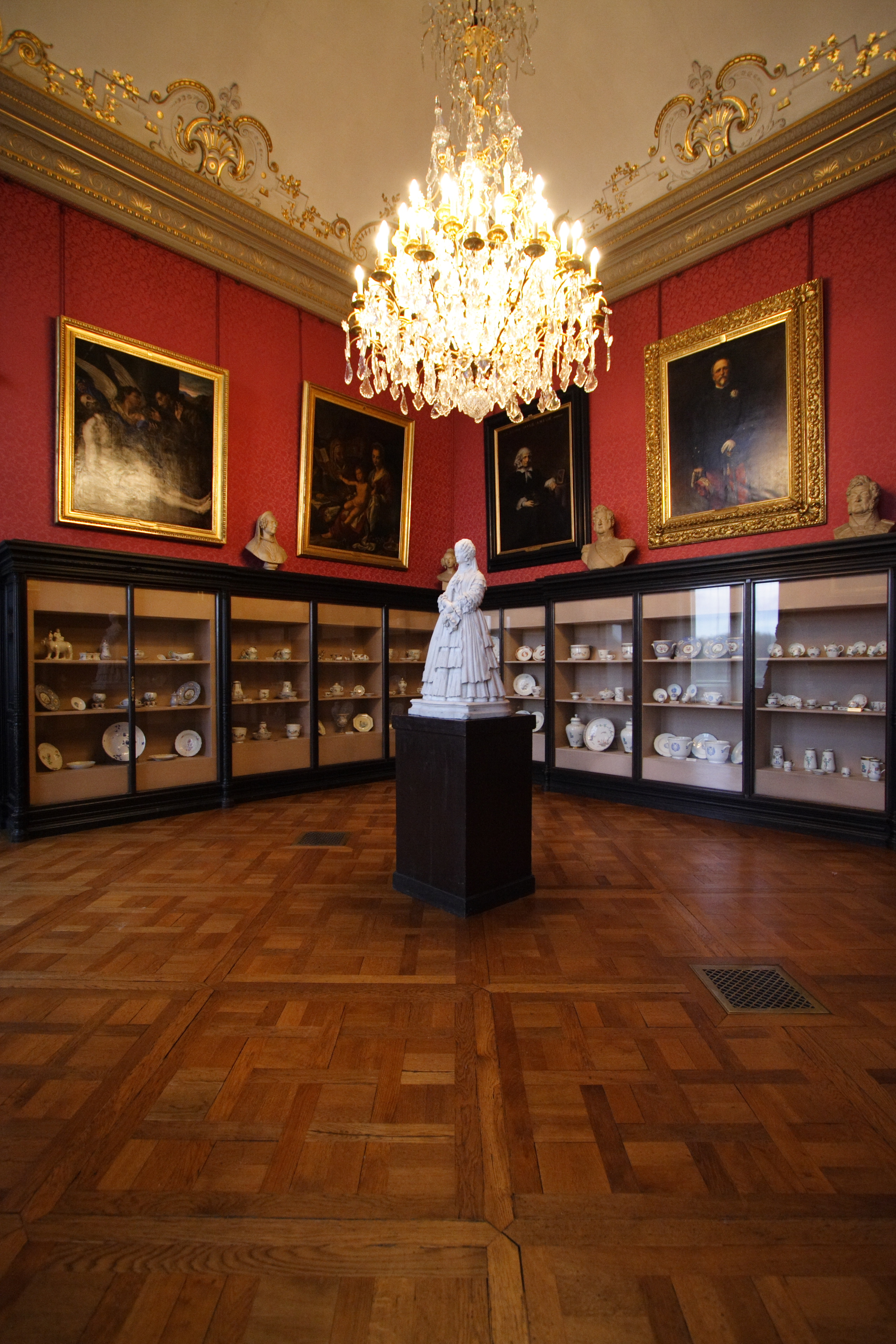
The Salon des porcelaines, Château de Chantilly

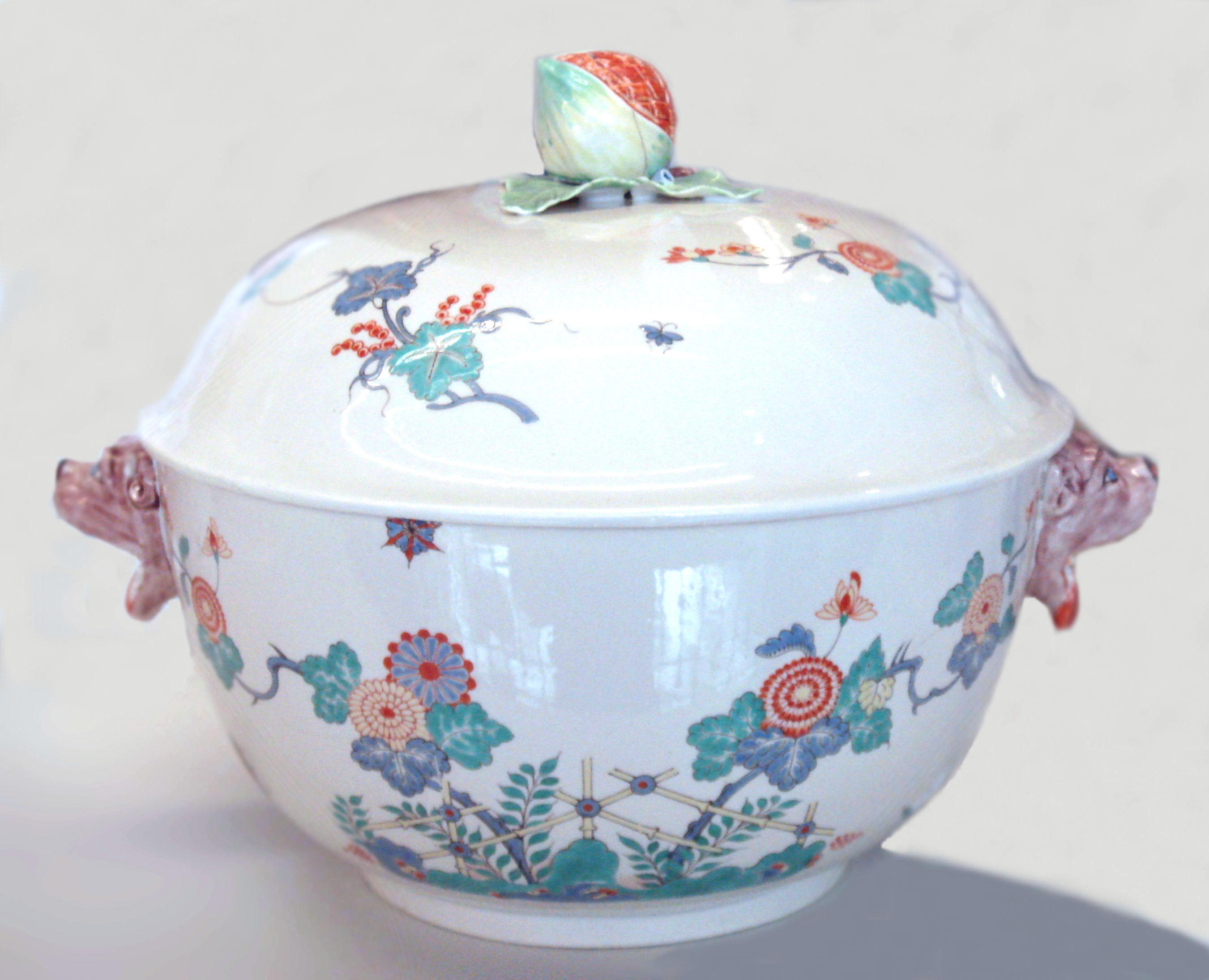
Chantilly soft-porcelain terrine, Japanese Kakiemon style, 1725–1751

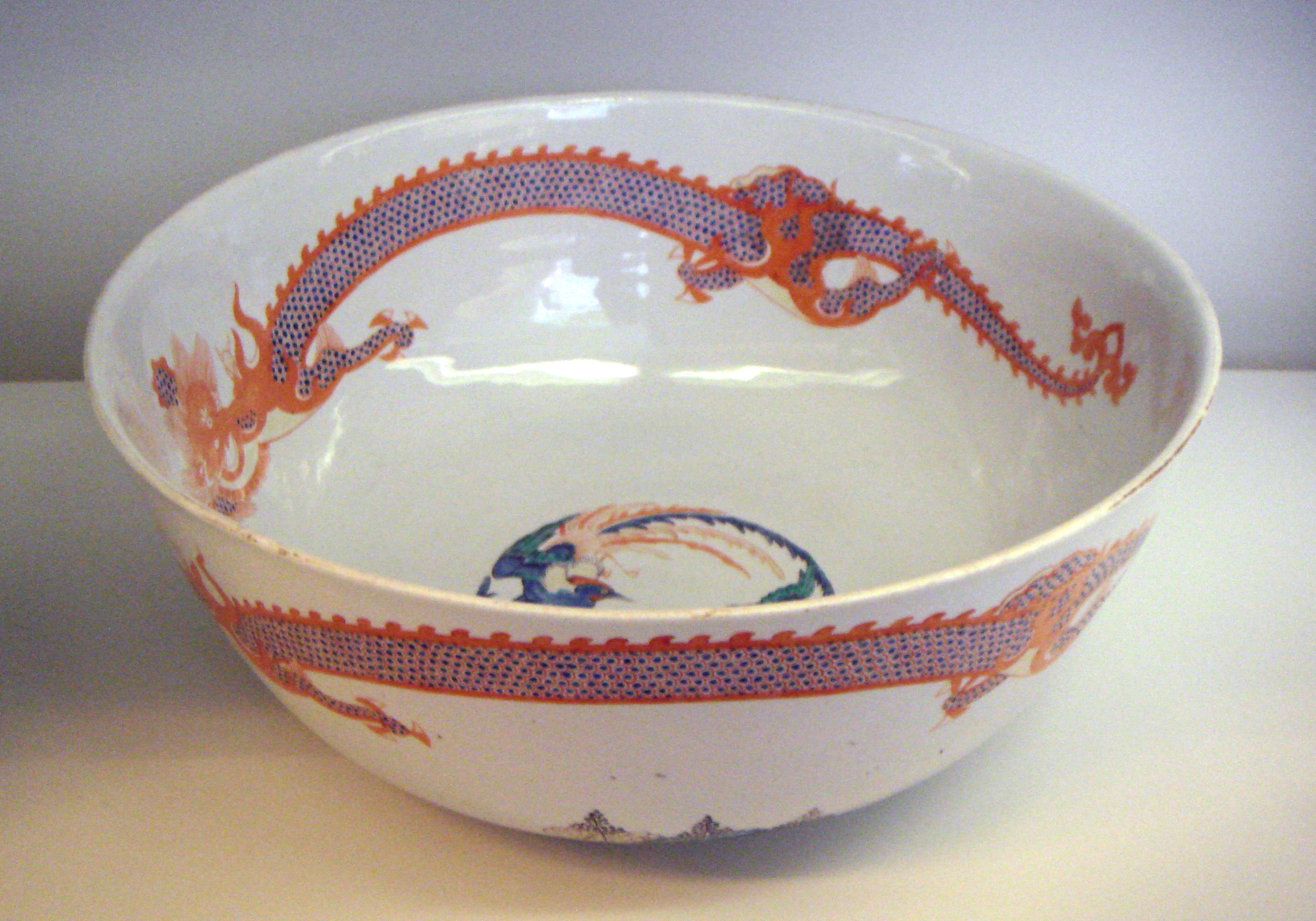
Chantilly soft-paste porcelain bowl, with Chinese dragon, 1725–1751

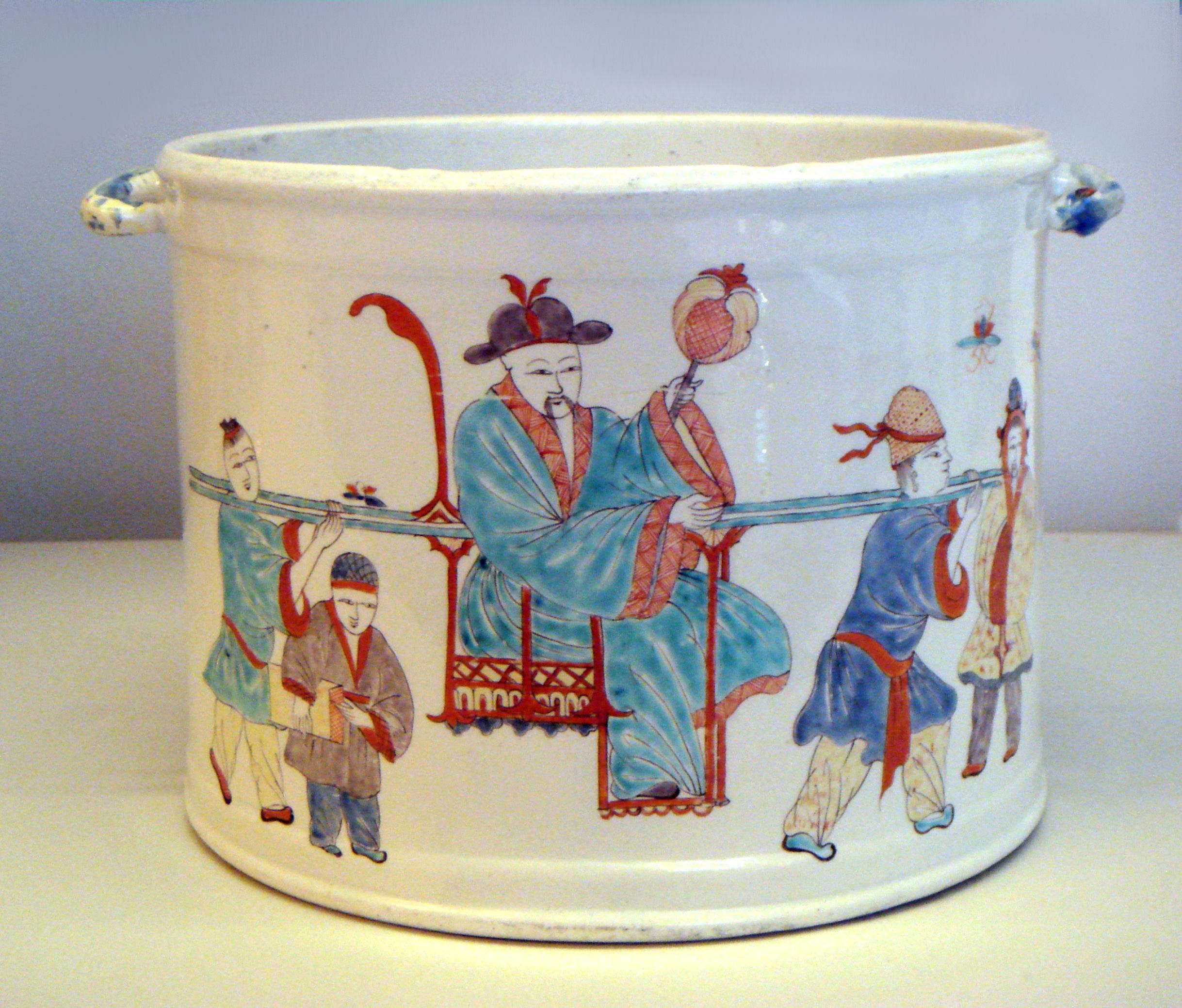
Chantilly soft-paste porcelain seau, or wine bucket, 1725–1751

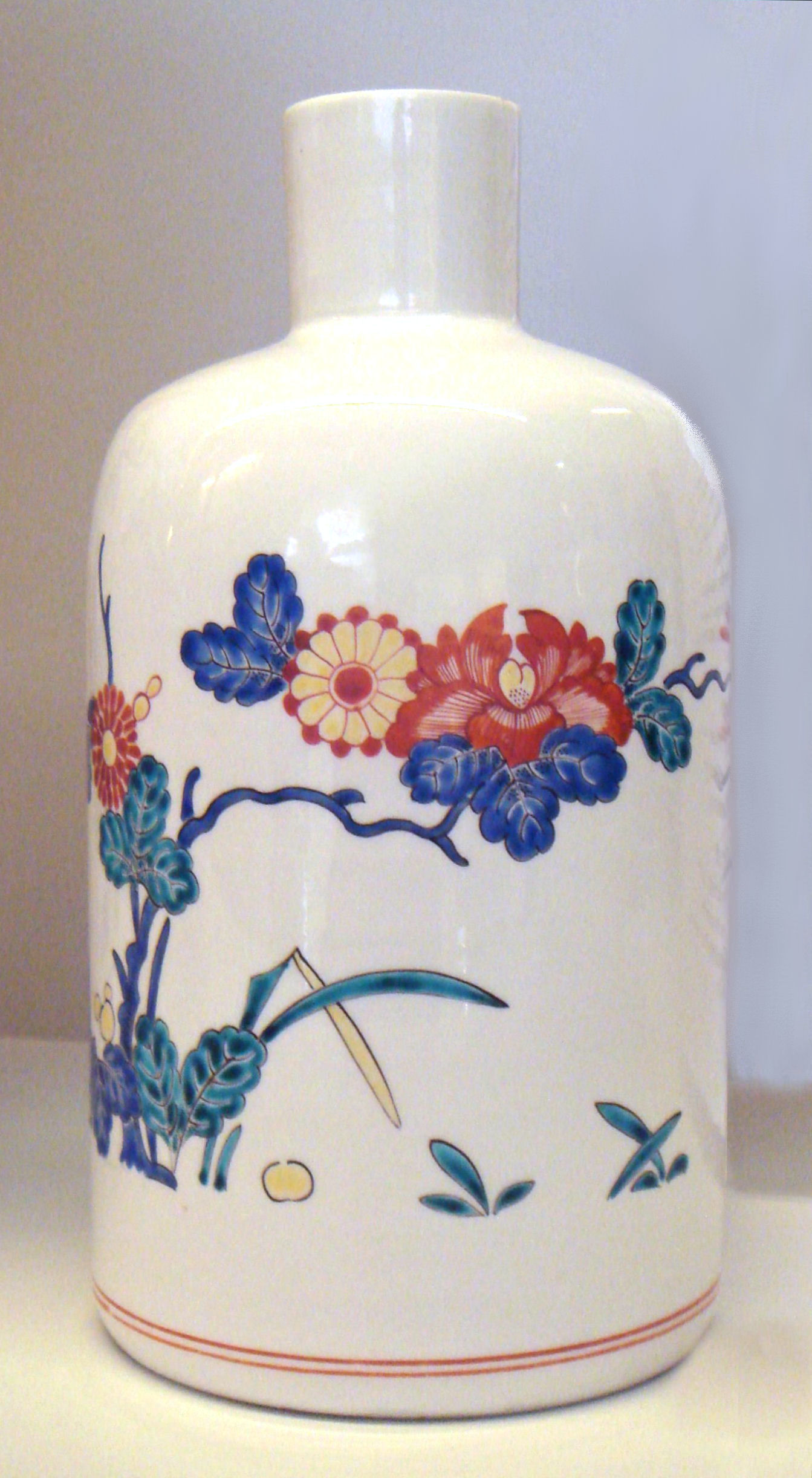
Chantilly soft-paste porcelain bottle in the Japanese Kakiemon style, 1730–1735

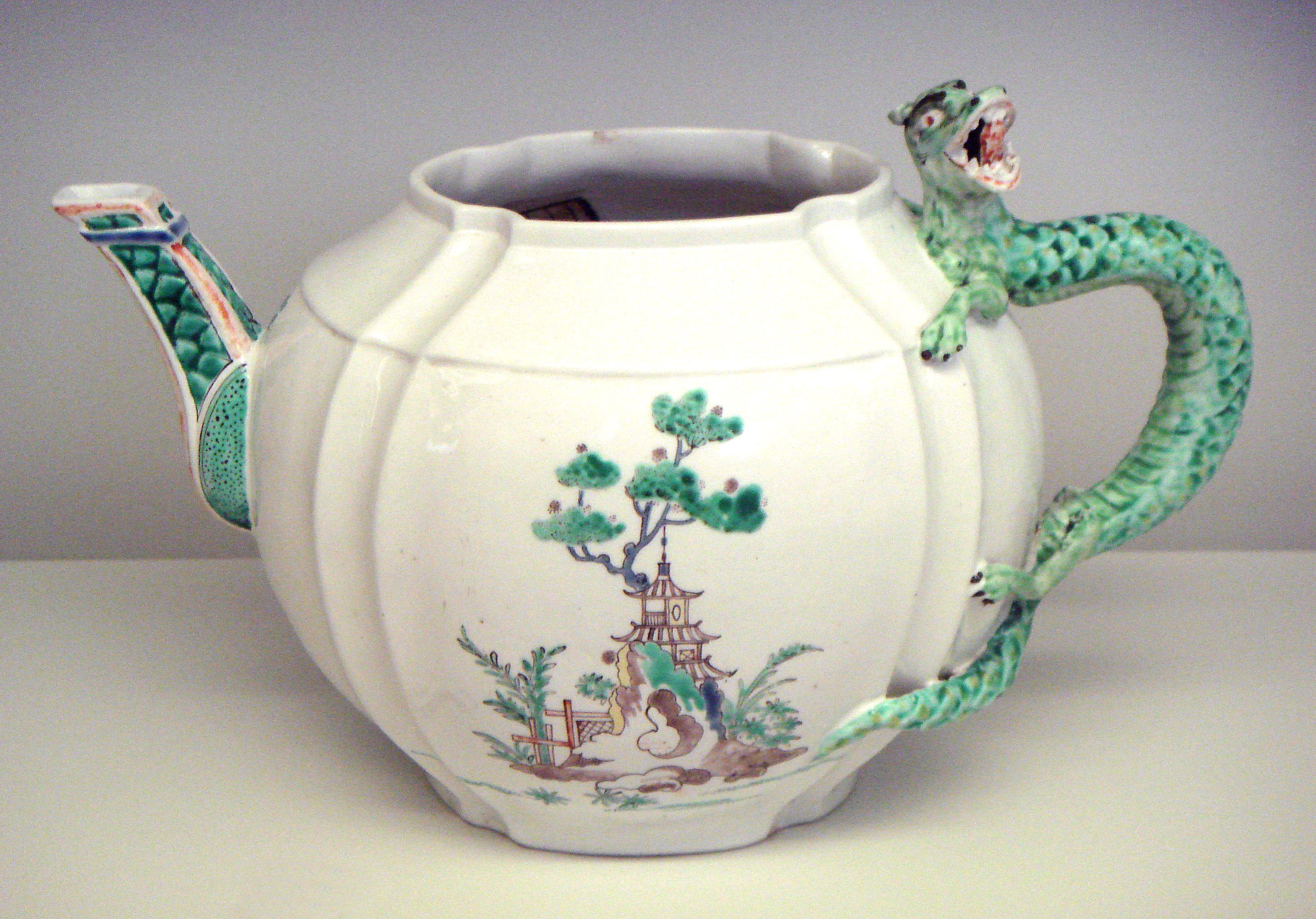
Chantilly soft-paste porcelain teapot, with Chinese dragon, 1735–1740

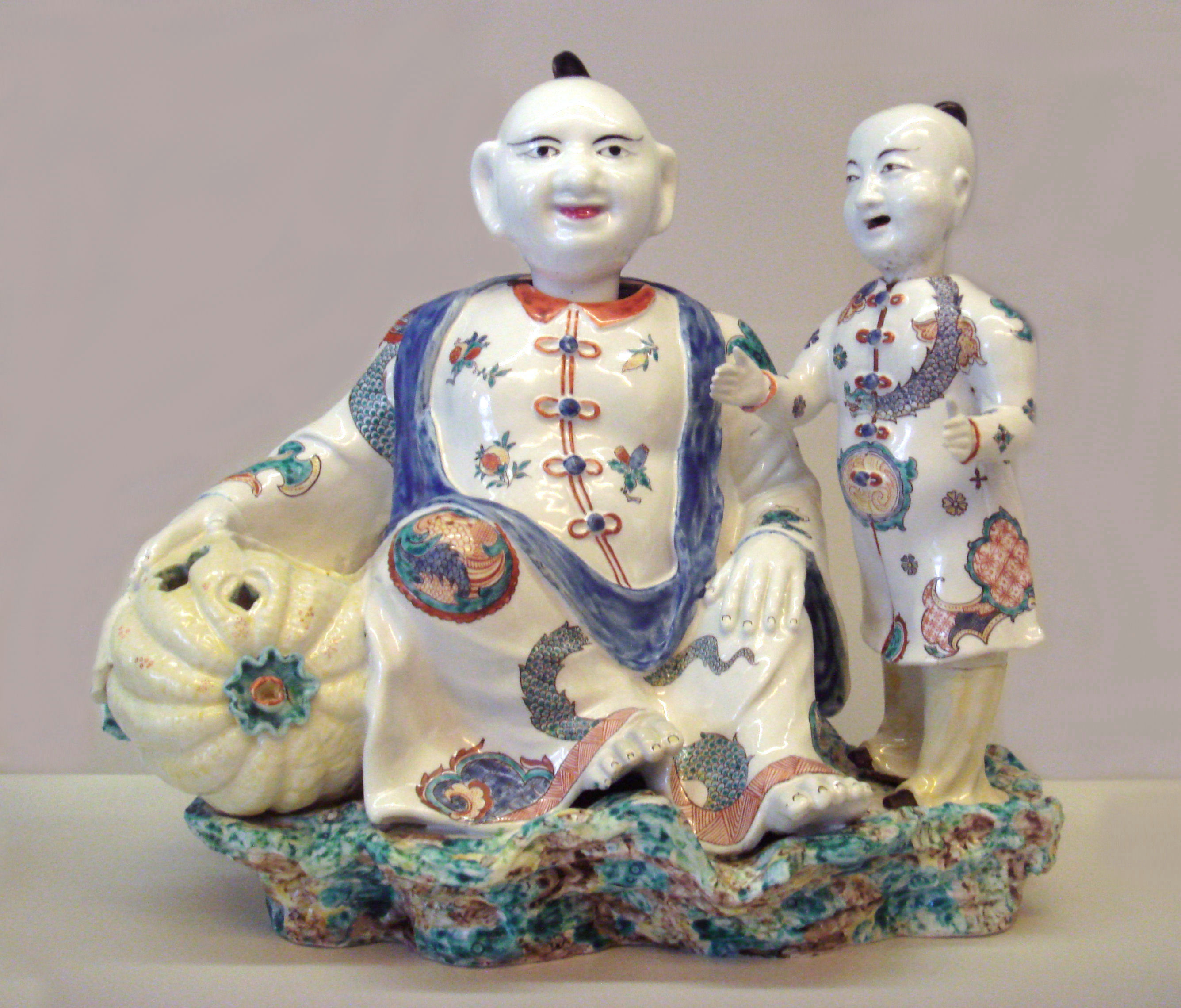
Chantilly soft-paste porcelain Magots, 1740

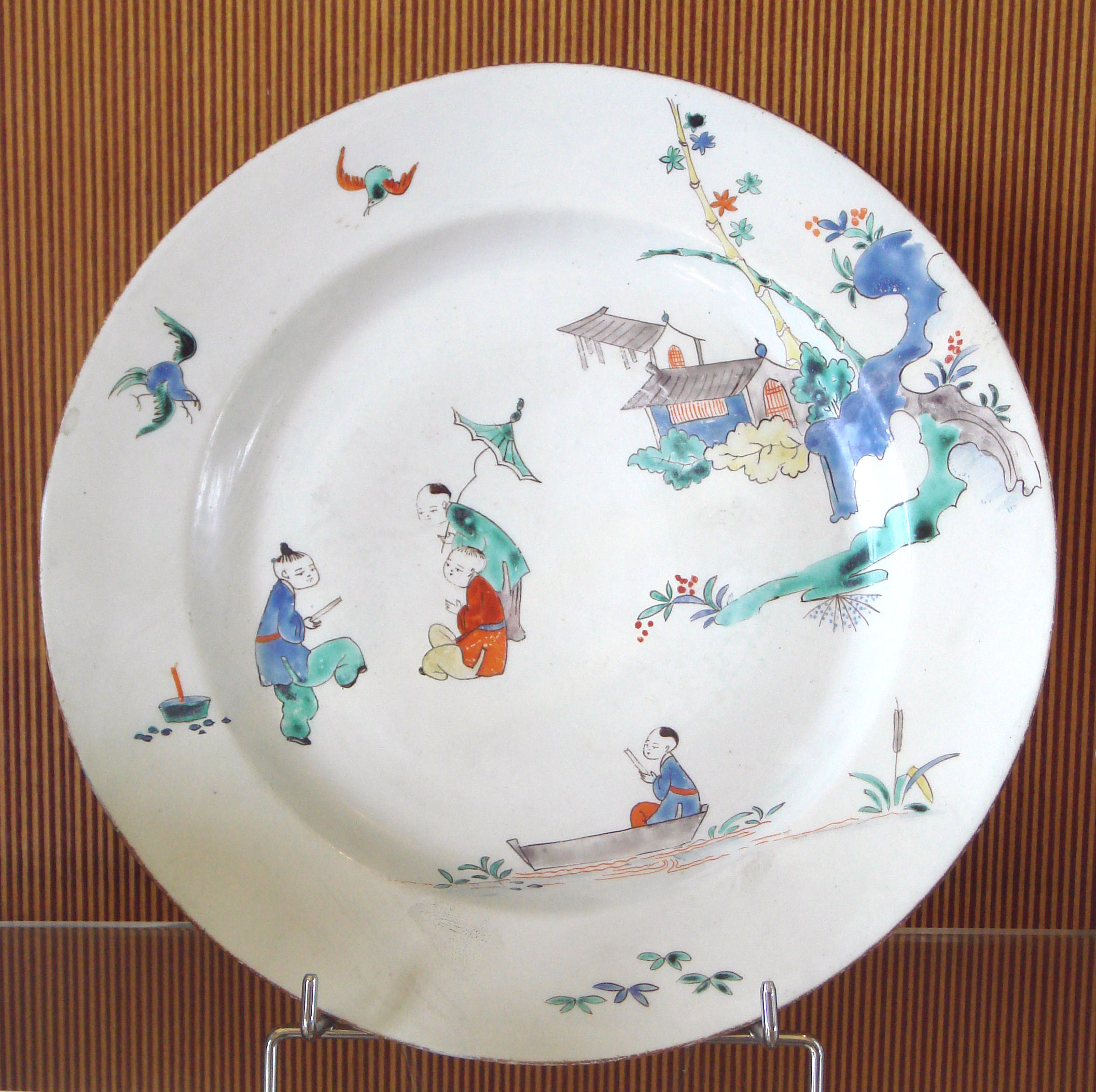
Chantilly porcelain plate, Kakiemon style, 1725–1751

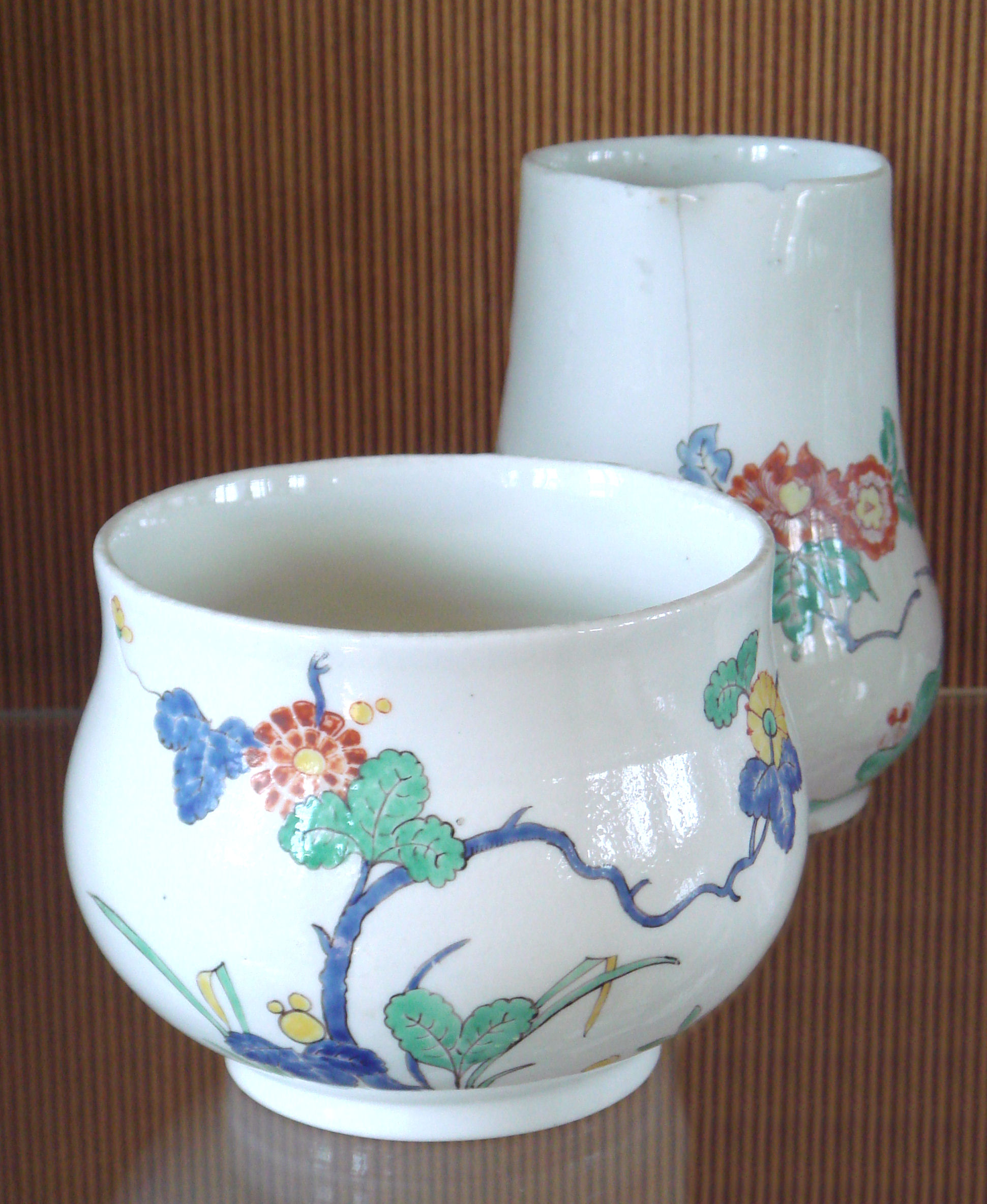
Chantilly porcelain sugar bowl, Kakiemon style, 1725–1751

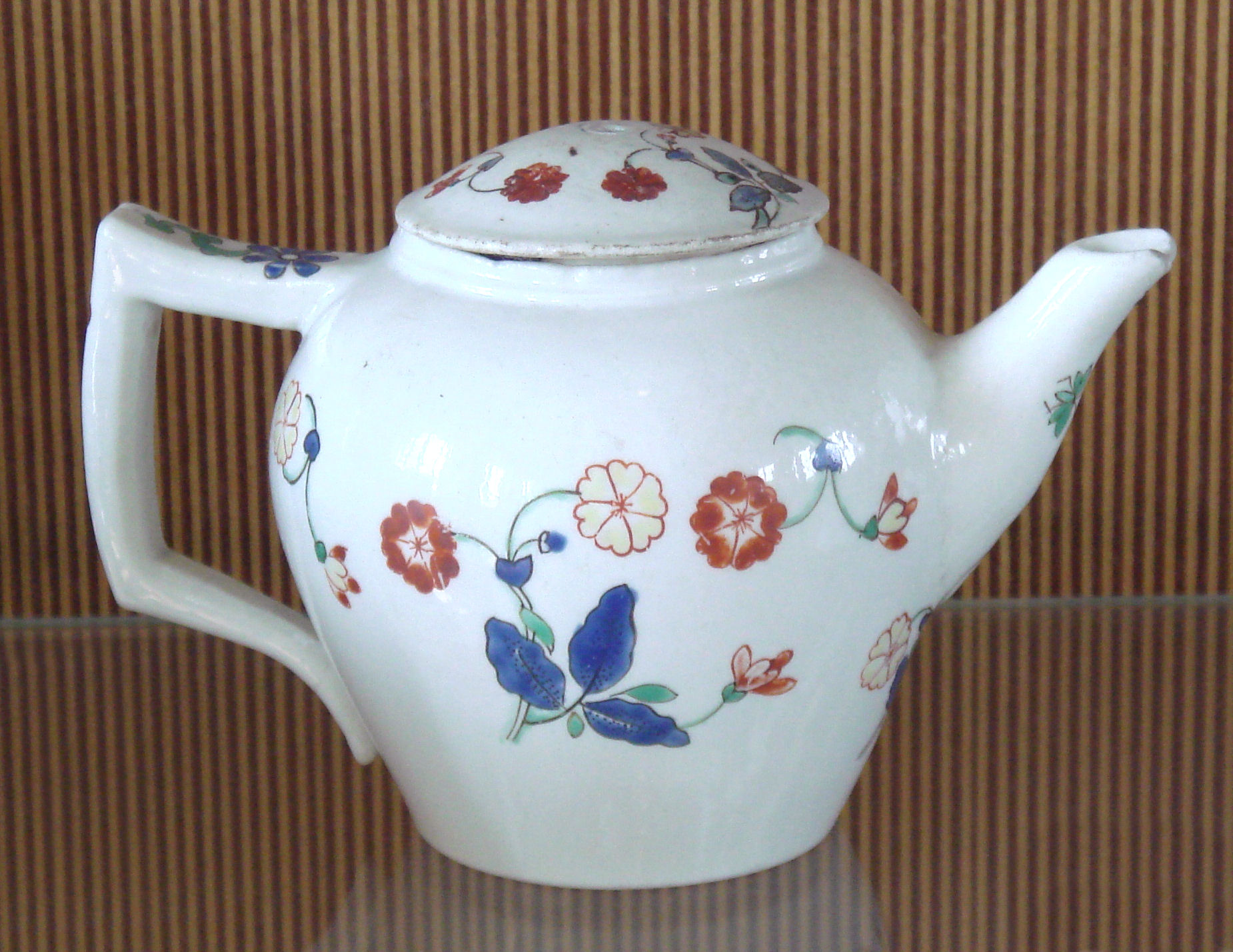
Chantilly milk pot in Kakiemon style, 1725–1751

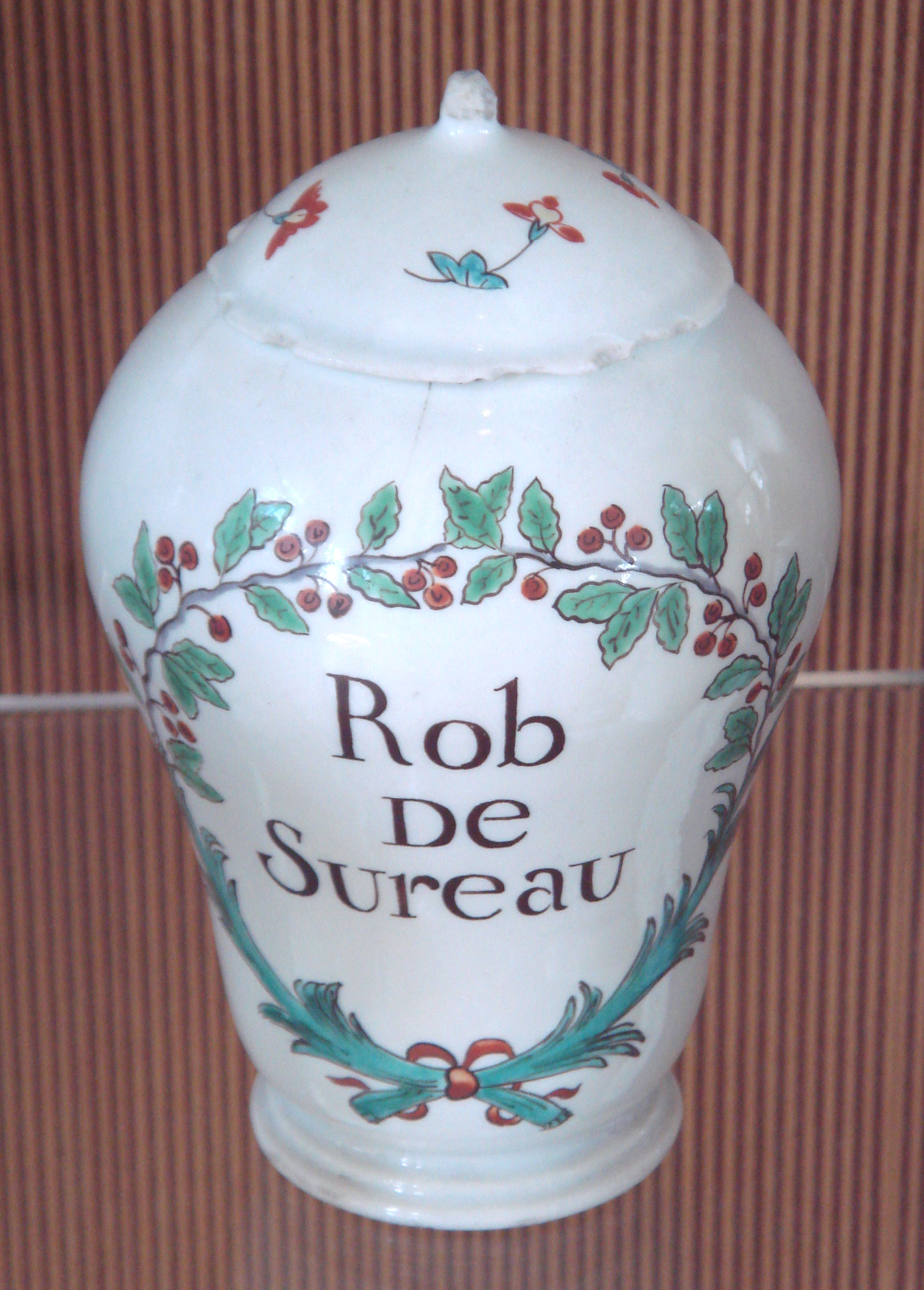
Chantilly pharmacological jar, with Kakiemon designs, 1725–1751

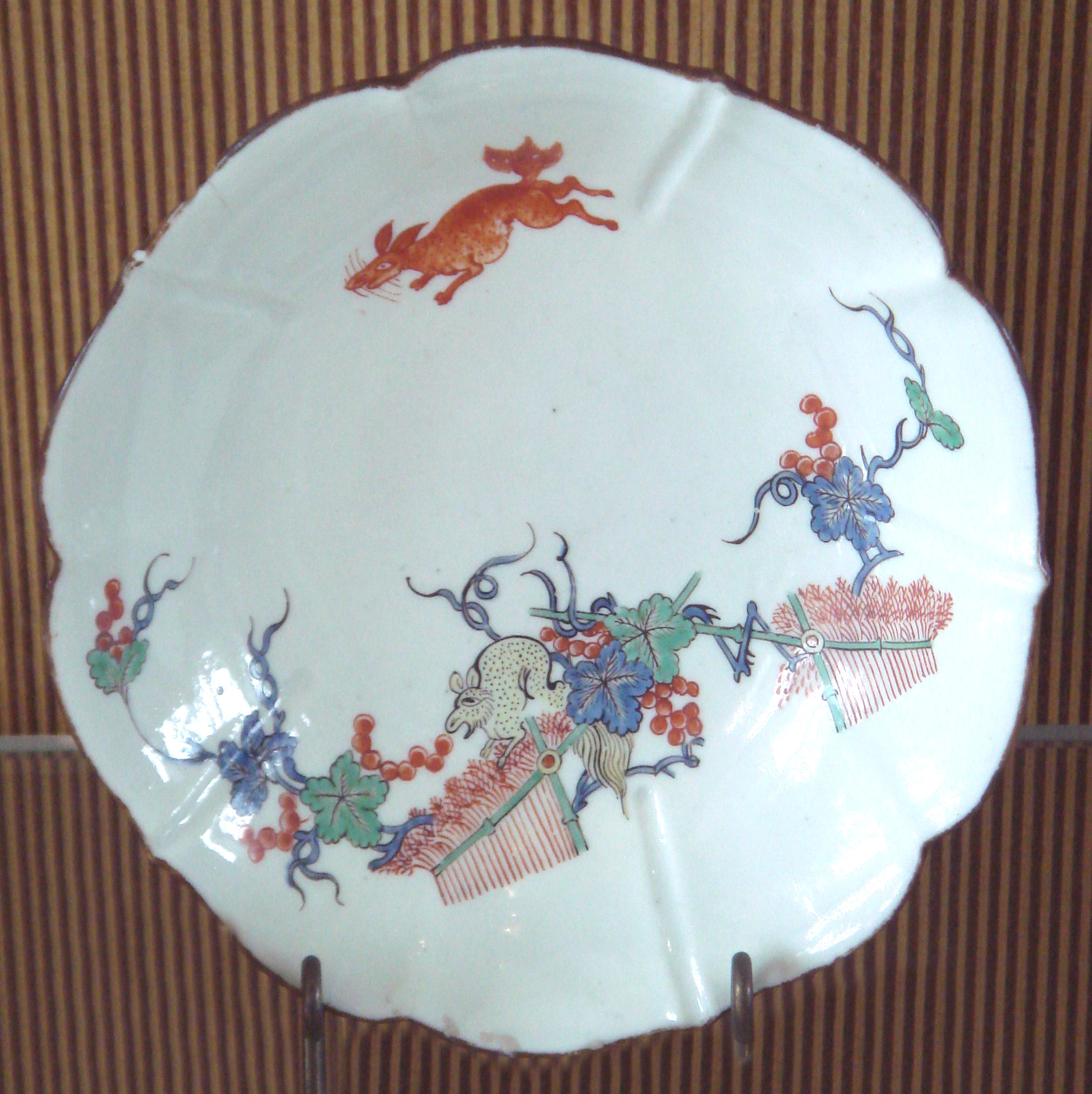
Chantilly soft-paste porcelain plate with Japanese Kakiemon design, 1725–1751

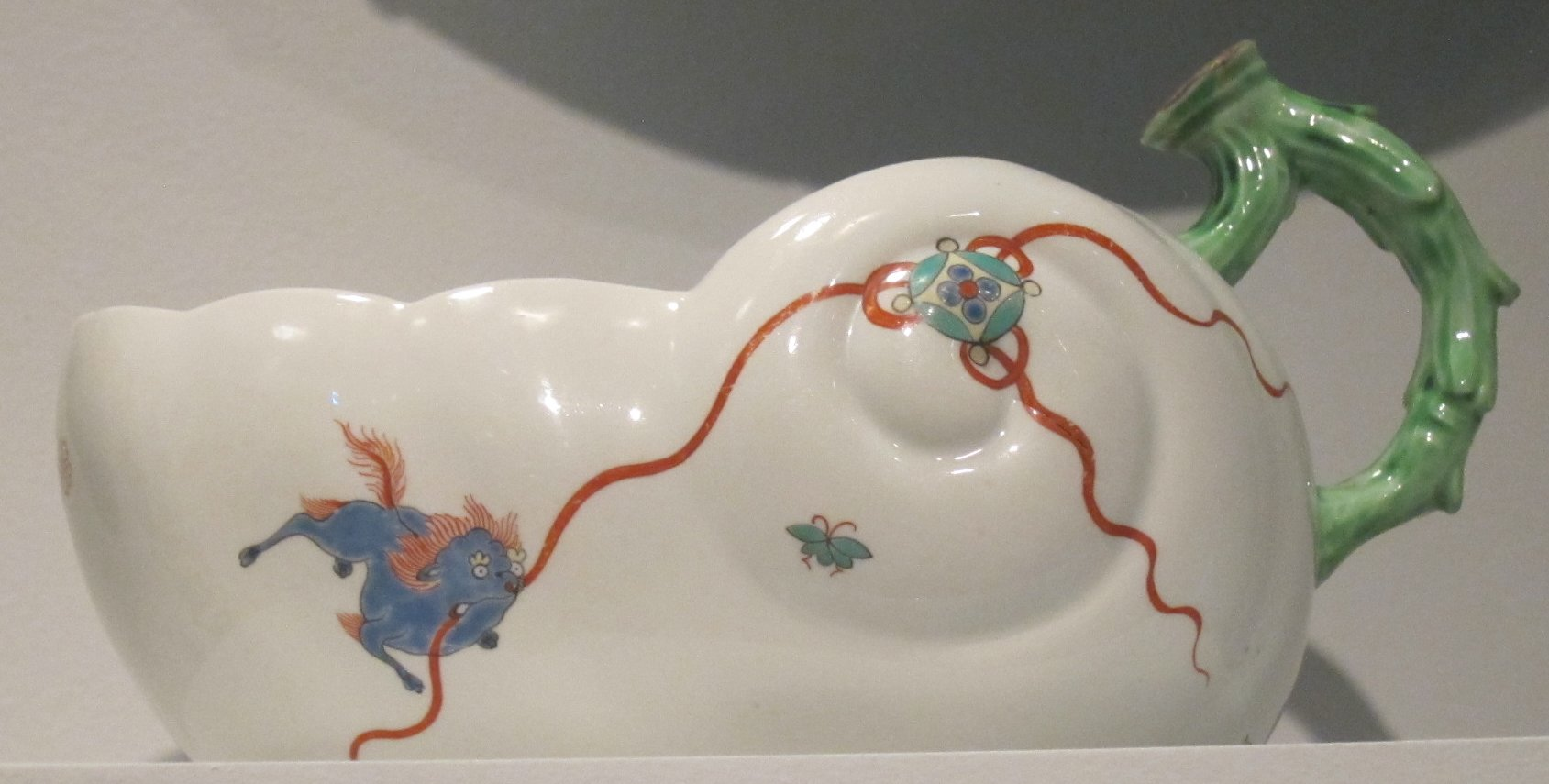
French bourdaloue, Chantilly, soft-paste porcelain, c. 1735

== Intermediate period (1751–1760) ==
Potters from Chantilly were induced to move to Vincennes, initiating the porcelain manufacture that would receive royal patronage at Sèvres and absorb the French market for porcelain of the highest refinement; letters patent of 1752 granting a monopoly to Vincennes of polychrome decors further reduced Chantilly's scope.

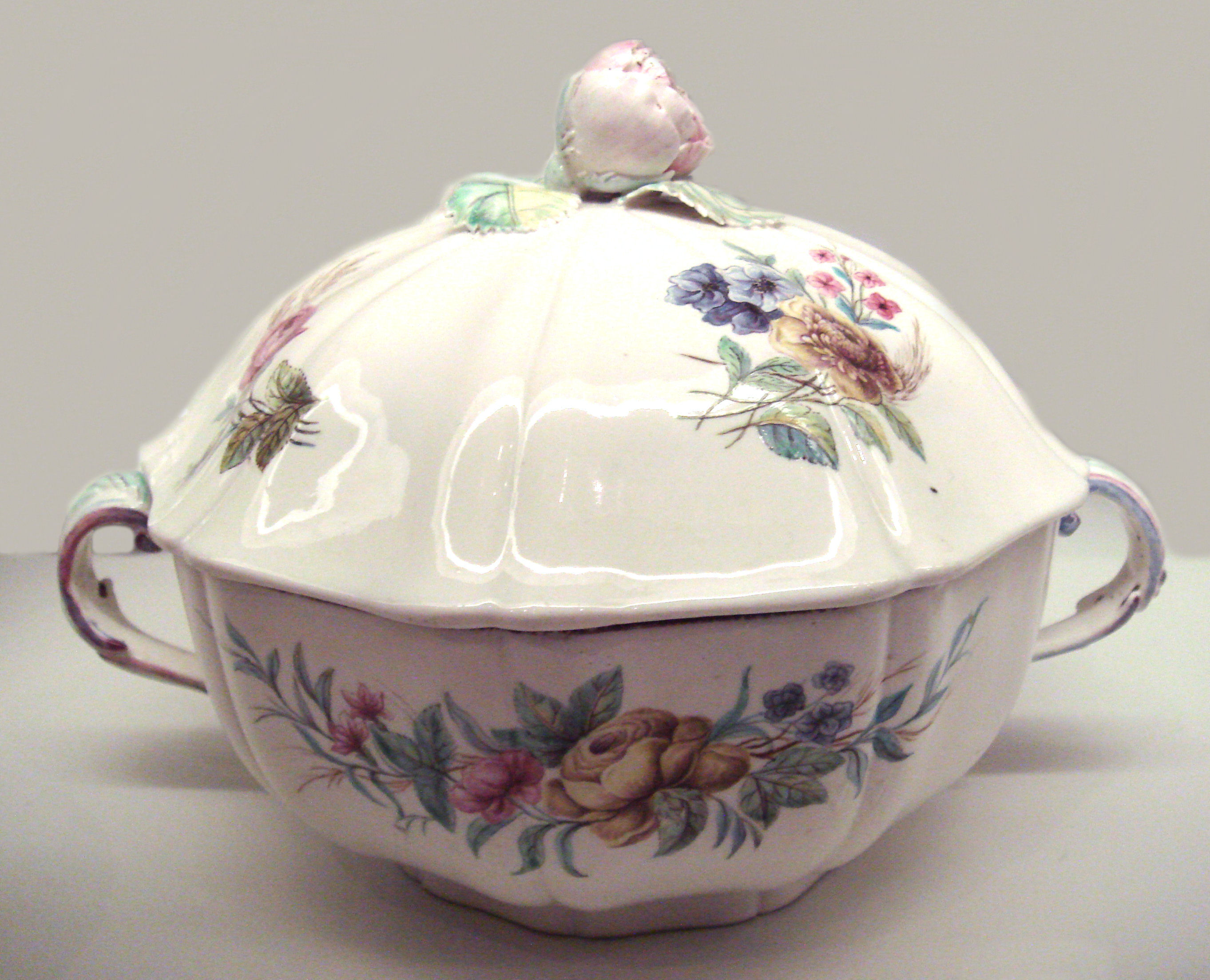
Chantilly soft-paste porcelain, 1750–1760

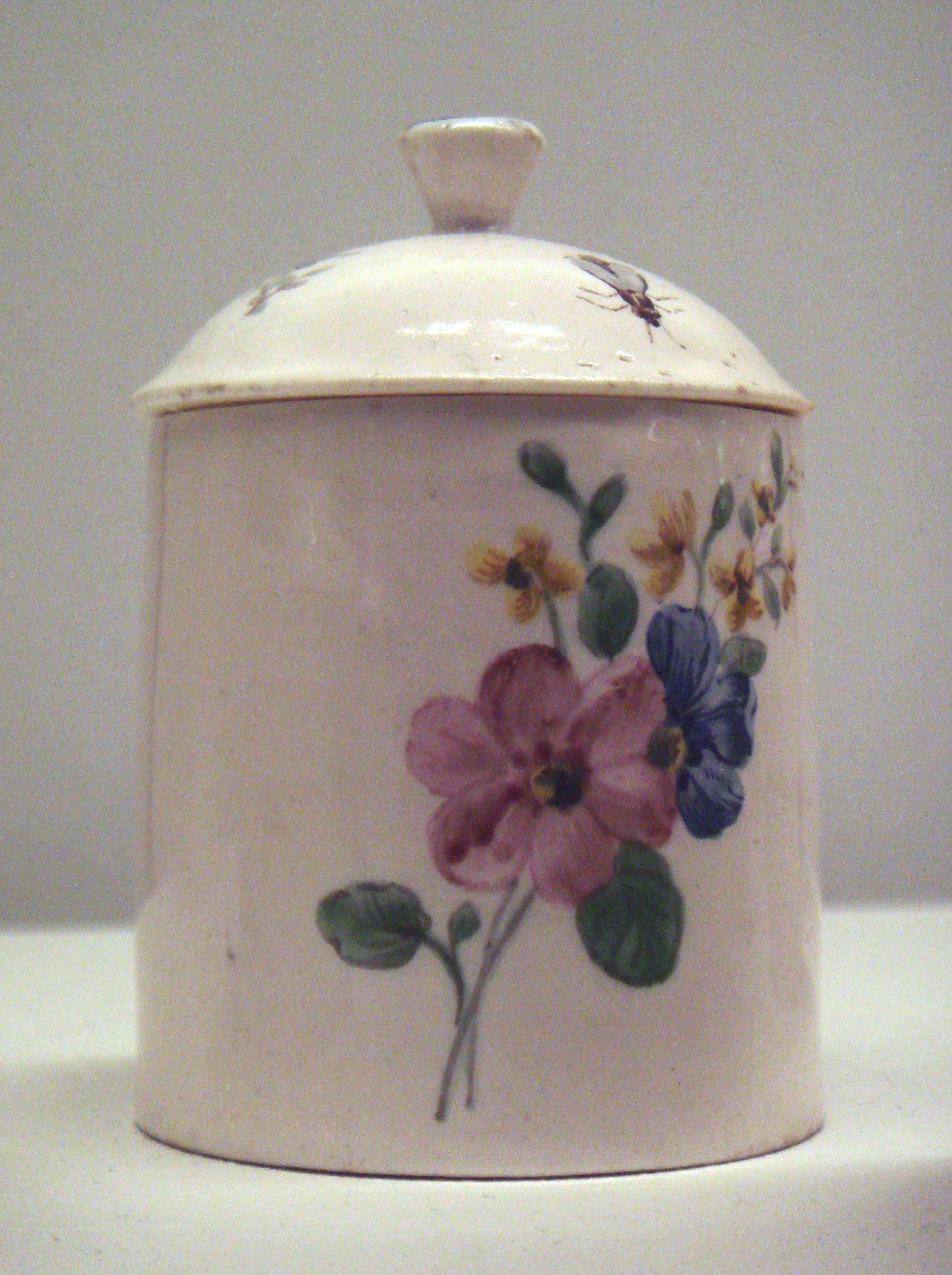
Chantilly soft-paste porcelain, 1750–1760

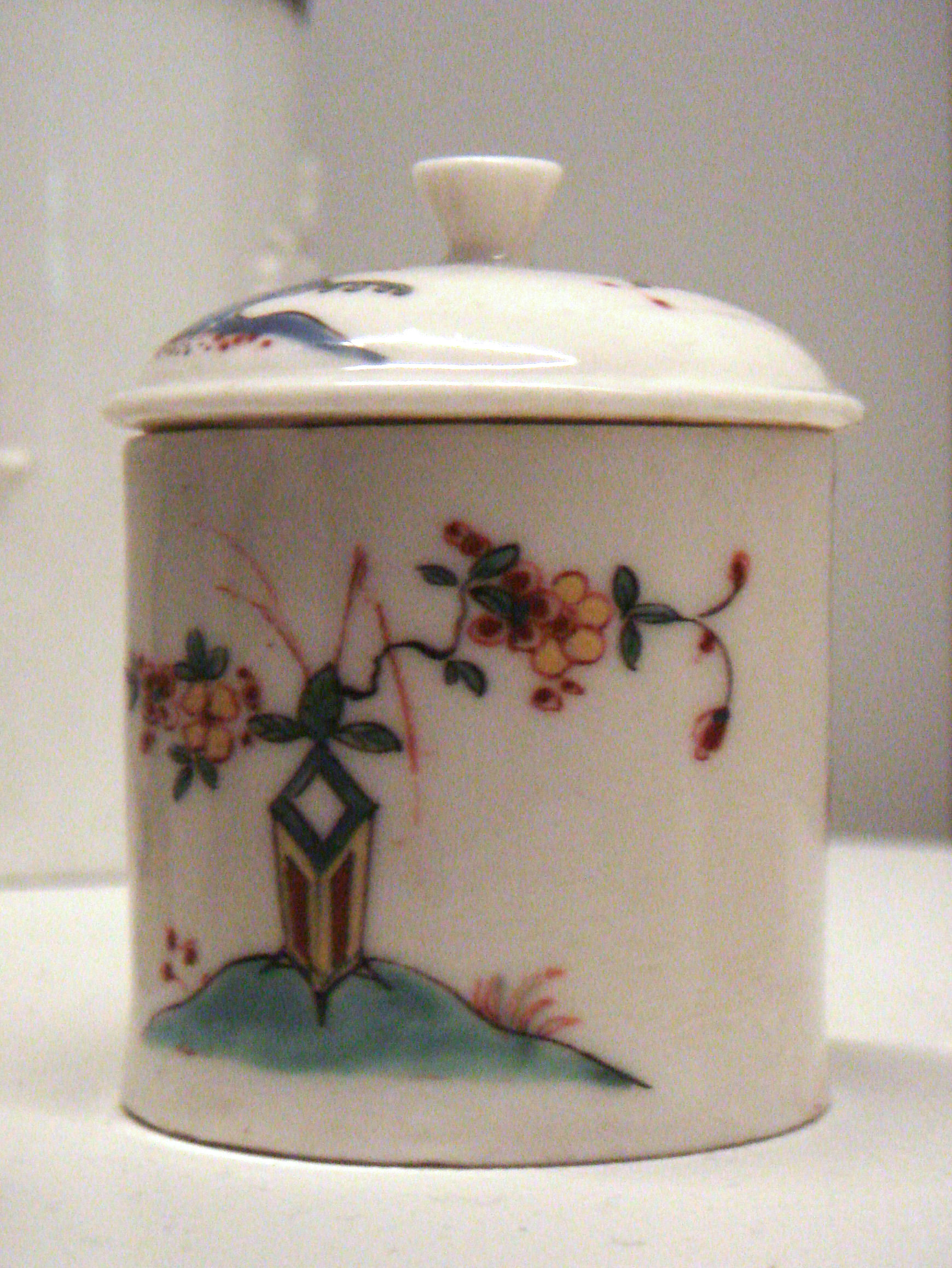
Chantilly soft-paste porcelain, 1750–1760

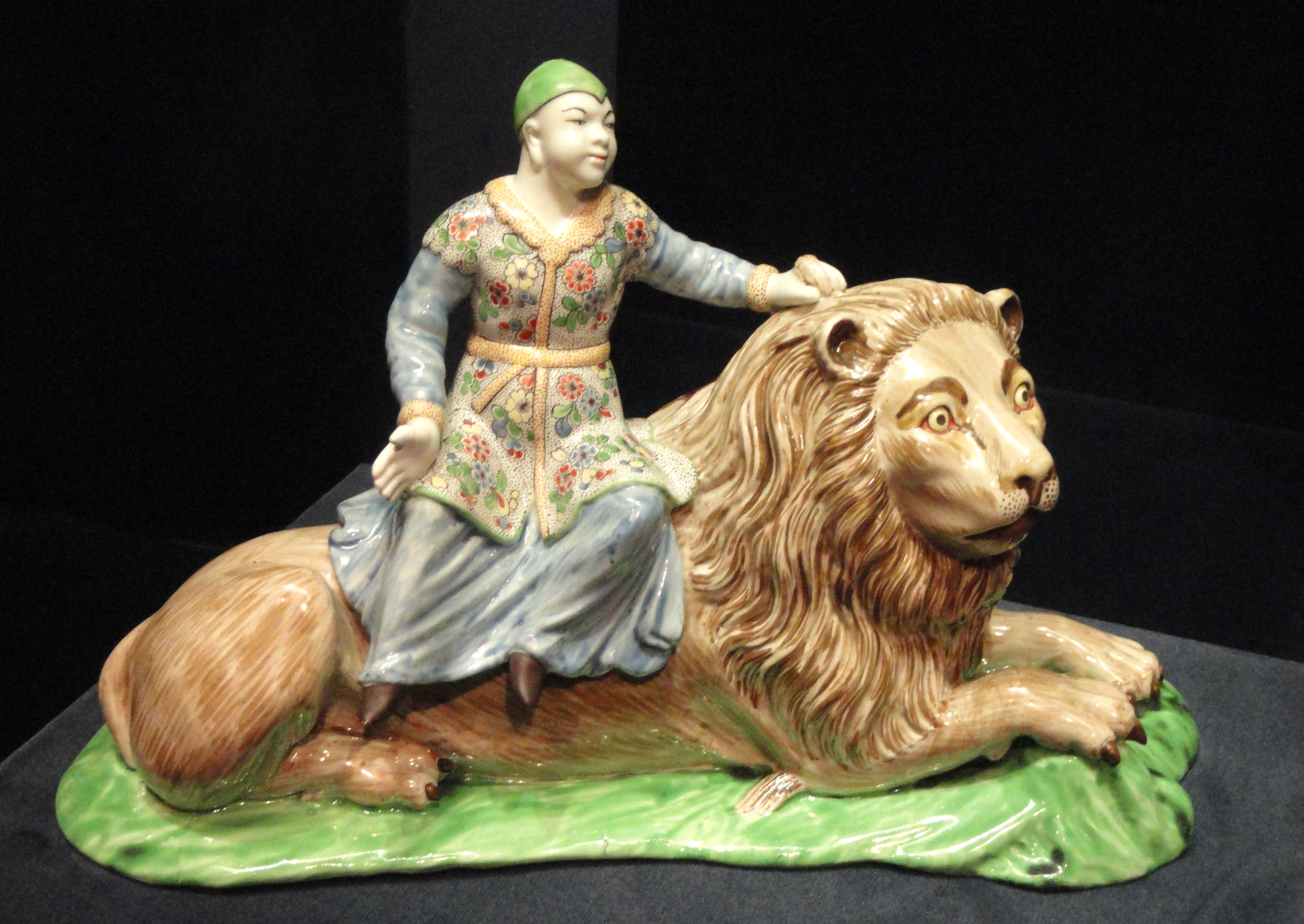
Figure seated on a lion, Chantilly Porcelain Factory, about 1750

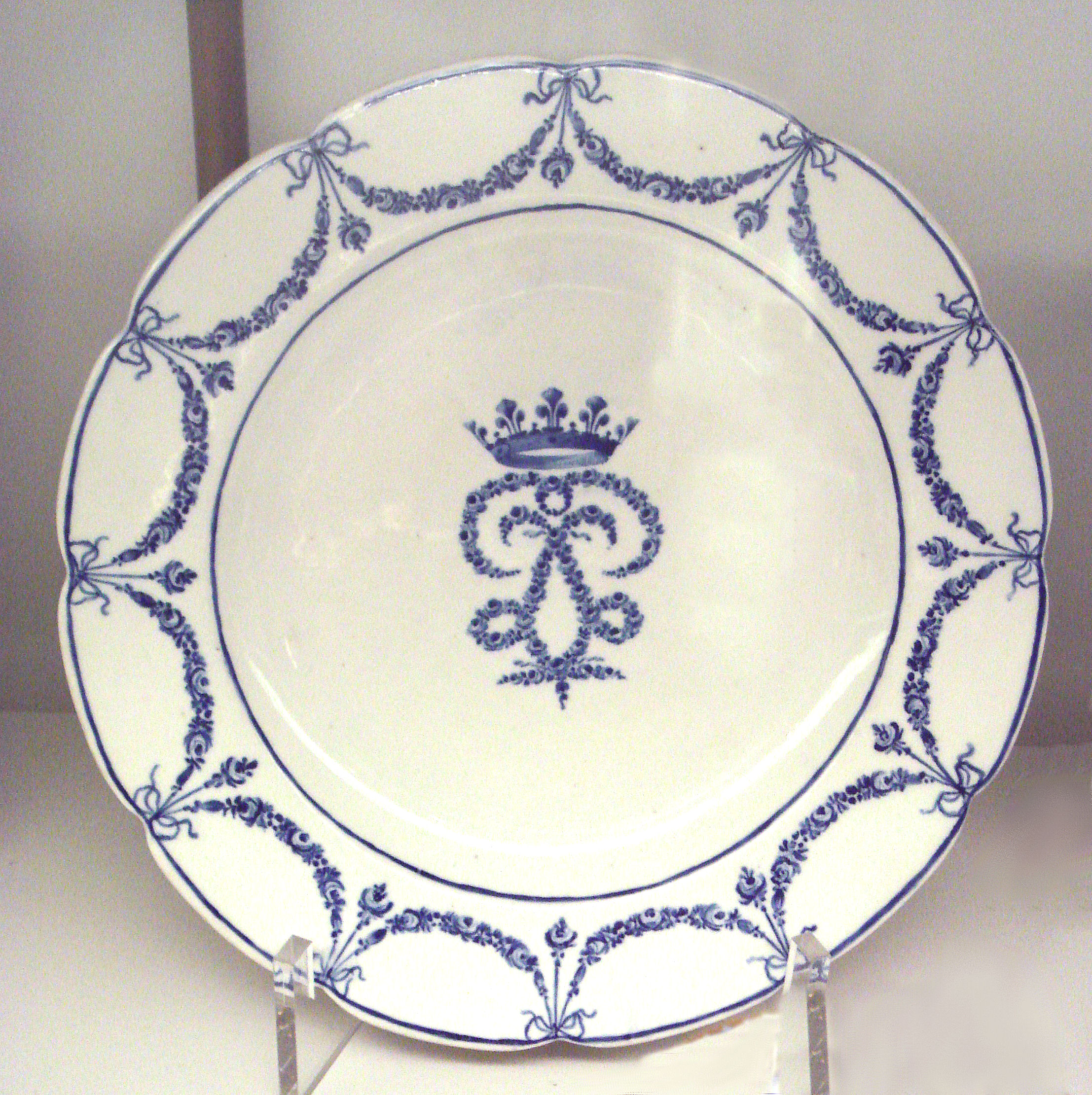
Chantilly soft-porcelain plate, circa 1760

== Late period (1760–1800) ==
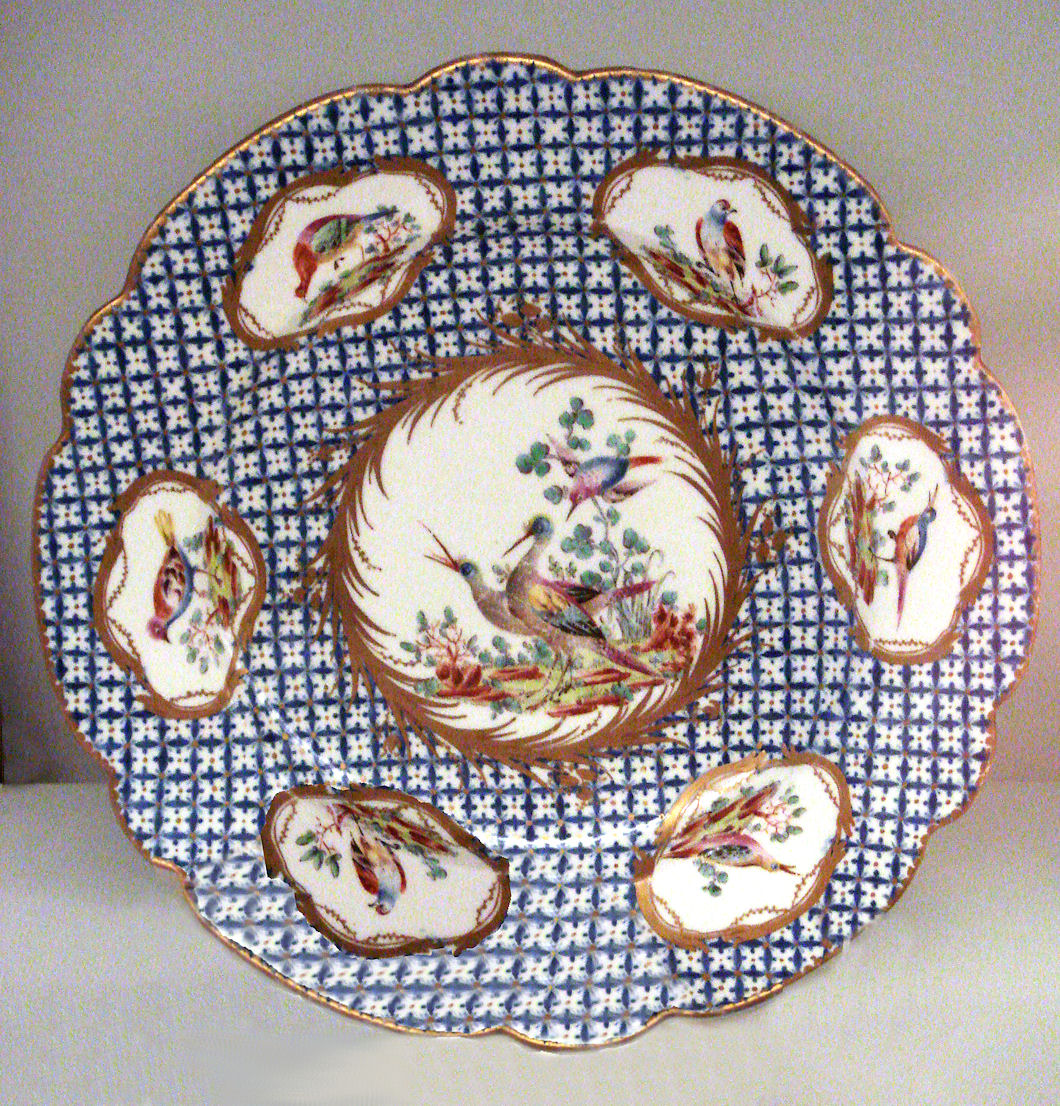
Chantilly soft-paste porcelain plate, 1753–1760

The factory at Chantilly produced some wares in the Vincennes-Sèvres taste but, especially after its sale in 1781 by Dame Adam, was in rapid decline towards the end of the Ancien Régime, squeezed between the competition of Sèvres at the high end of the market, and, after the Anglo-French commercial treaty of 1788, by Wedgwood cream ware for table wares. Its manager, the Englishman Christopher Potter, bought it in the early stages of the French Revolution (1792), but it closed shop in 1800. In fact, Potter set up two different manufactures, the first one early 1792 and the second in 1795.

== See also ==
- Orientalism in early modern France
