= Saint-Cloud porcelain =

French soft-paste porcelain

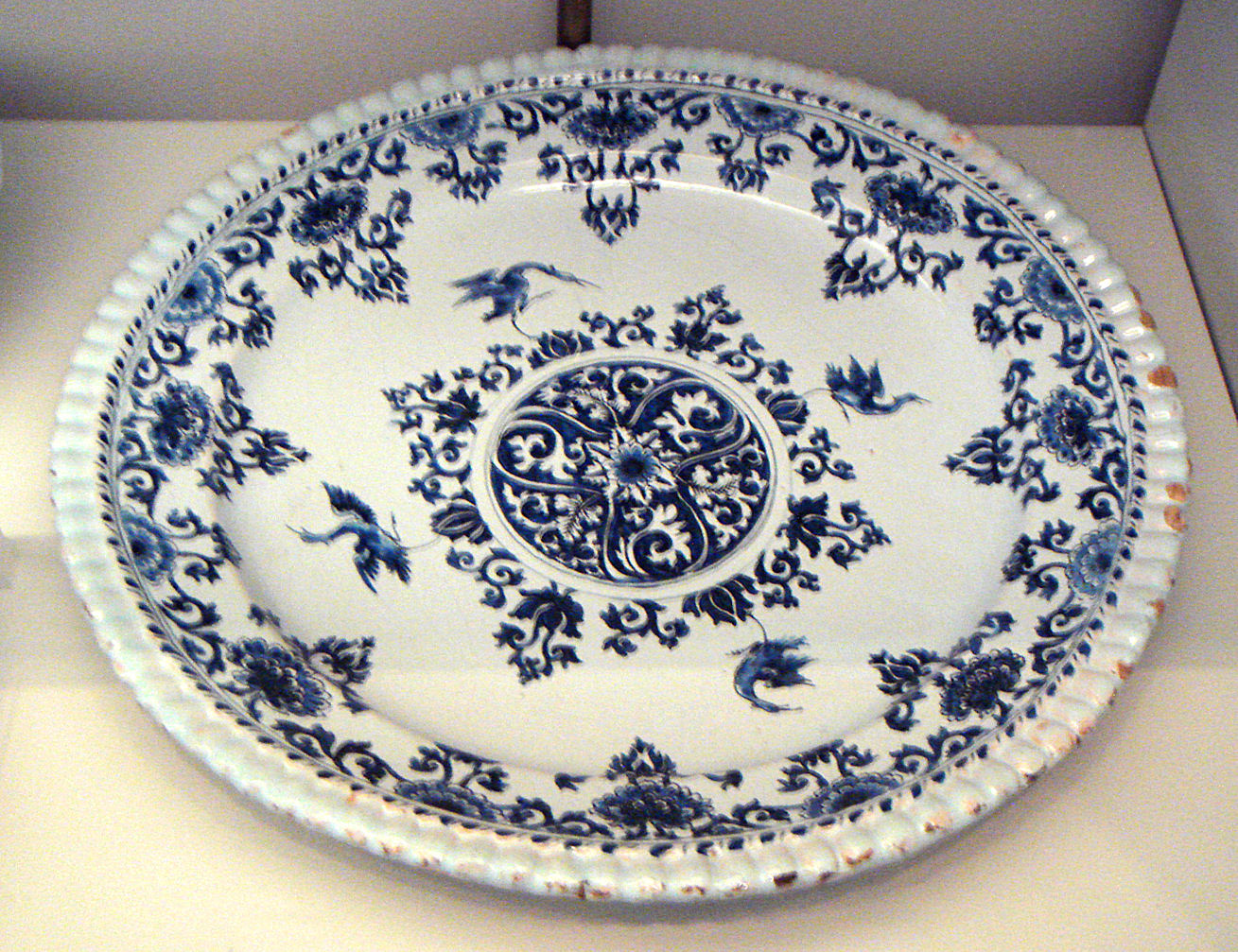
Saint-Cloud faience plate, 1700–1710

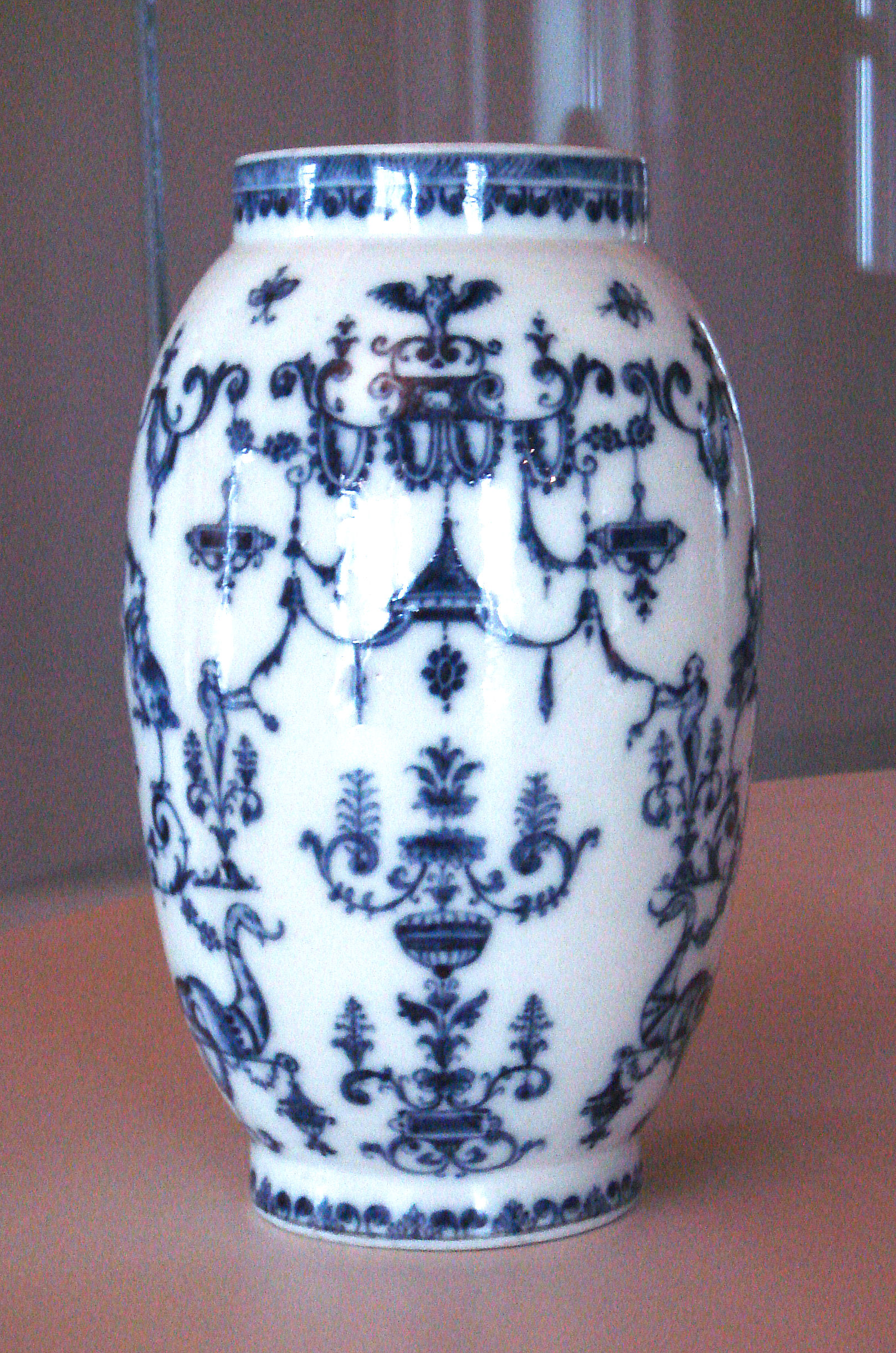
Saint Cloud soft porcelain vase, with blue designs under glaze, 1695–1700

Saint-Cloud porcelain was a type of soft-paste porcelain produced in the French town of Saint-Cloud from the late 17th to the mid 18th century.

== Foundation ==
In 1702, Philippe I, Duke of Orléans gave letters-patent to the family of Pierre Chicaneau, who were said to have been making porcelain as "perfect as the Chinese" since 1693. Chicaneau's factory was a pioneer in the manufacture of porcelain in Europe, where there had been many attempts to copy Chinese porcelain. Saint-Cloud developed a frit ("a mixture of a flux, sand and chalk") which was close, although not similar, to Asian porcelain.

== Blue-and-white porcelain ==
The porcelain produced in Saint-Cloud was influenced by late Ming blue and white porcelain and its motifs were based on Chinese originals. The typical underglaze blue painted Saint-Cloud porcelain, says W.B. Honey, "is one of the most distinct and attractive of porcelains, and not the least part of its charm lies in the quality of the material itself. It is rarely of a pure white, but the warm yellowish or ivory tone of the best wares of the period is sympathetic and by no means a shortcoming; and while actually very soft and glassy, it has a firm texture unlike any other. The glaze often shows a fine satin-like pitting of the surface that helps to distinguish it from the brilliant shiny glaze of Mennecy porcelain, which is otherwise similar. The heavy build of the pieces is also characteristic and is saved from clumsiness by a finer sense of mass, revealed in the subtly graduated thickness of wall and a delicate shaping of edges."

== Polychrome porcelain ==
Around 1722, Chicaneau's business passed through marriage to Henri Trou. After 1730, polychrome porcelain came to be produced, also in imitation of Chinese polychrome styles of porcelain, such as the "Famille rose" types. The Japanese Kakiemon style of Arita porcelain, Japan, known as "Fleurs indiennes" ("Flowers of the Indies") was also used as an inspiration.

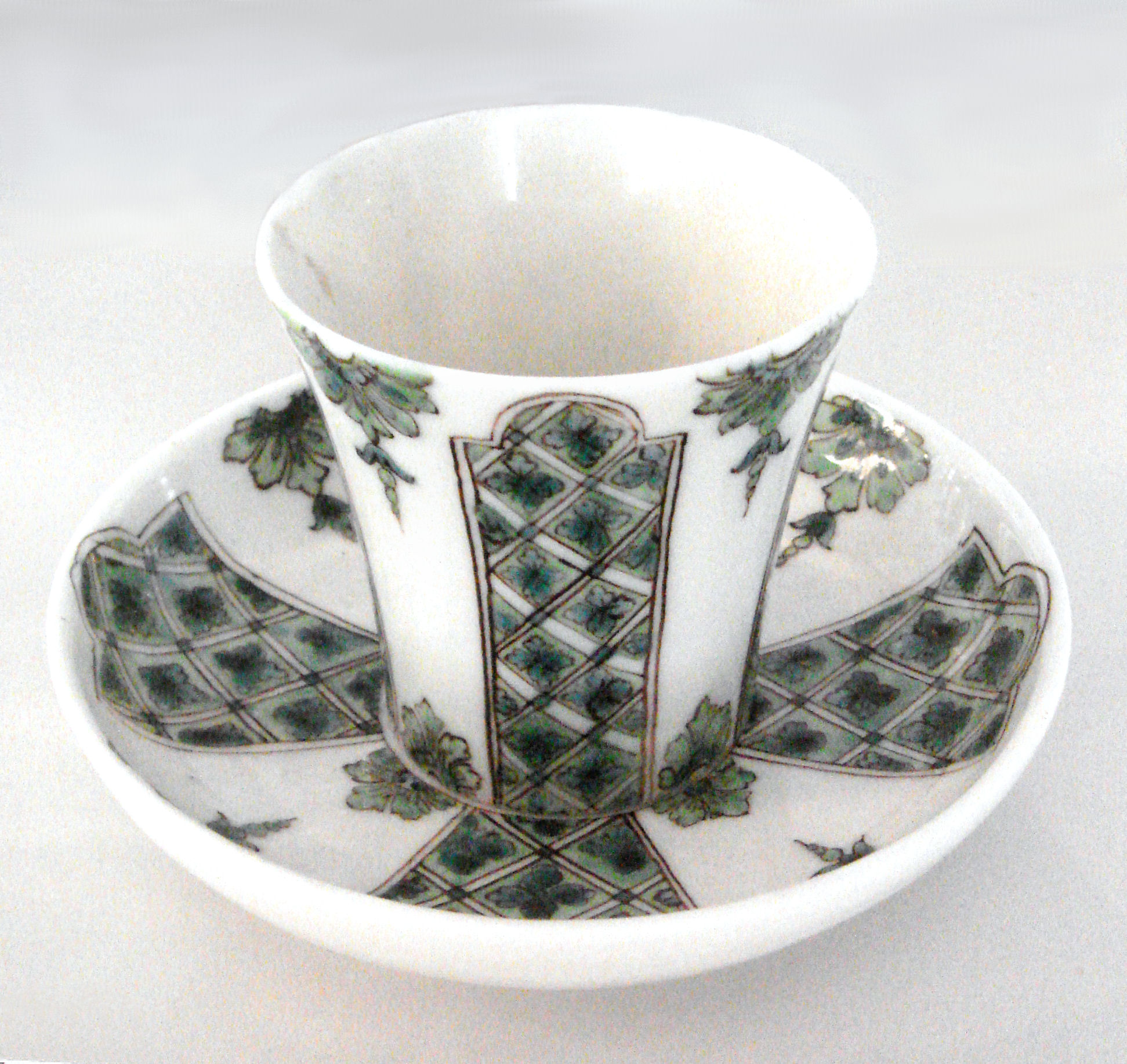
Saint-Cloud soft porcelain cup, 1700–1720

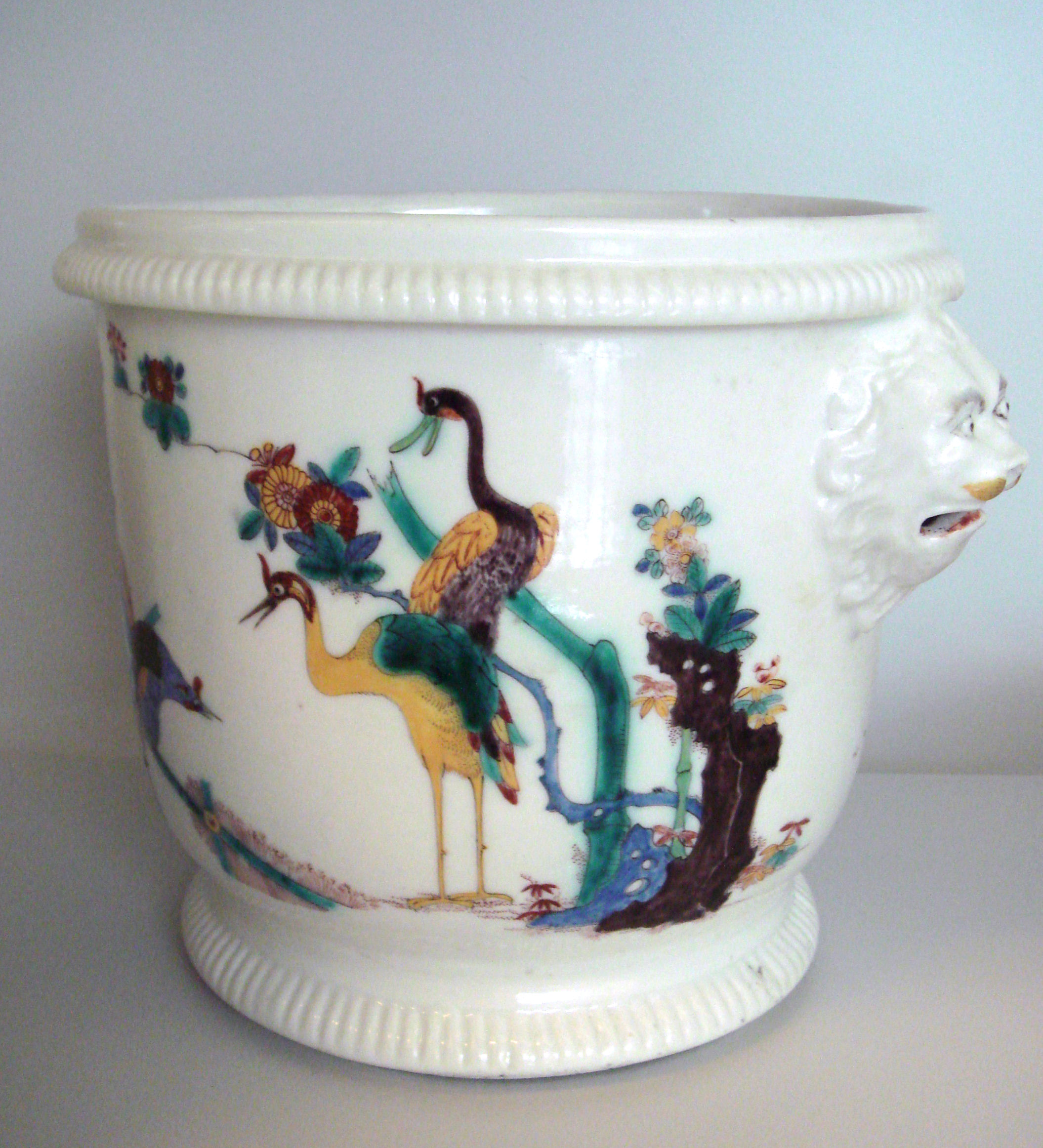
Saint-Cloud soft porcelain seau, 1720–1730. "Fleurs indiennes" ("Flowers of the Indies") in imitation of the Kakiemon style of Arita porcelain, Japan.

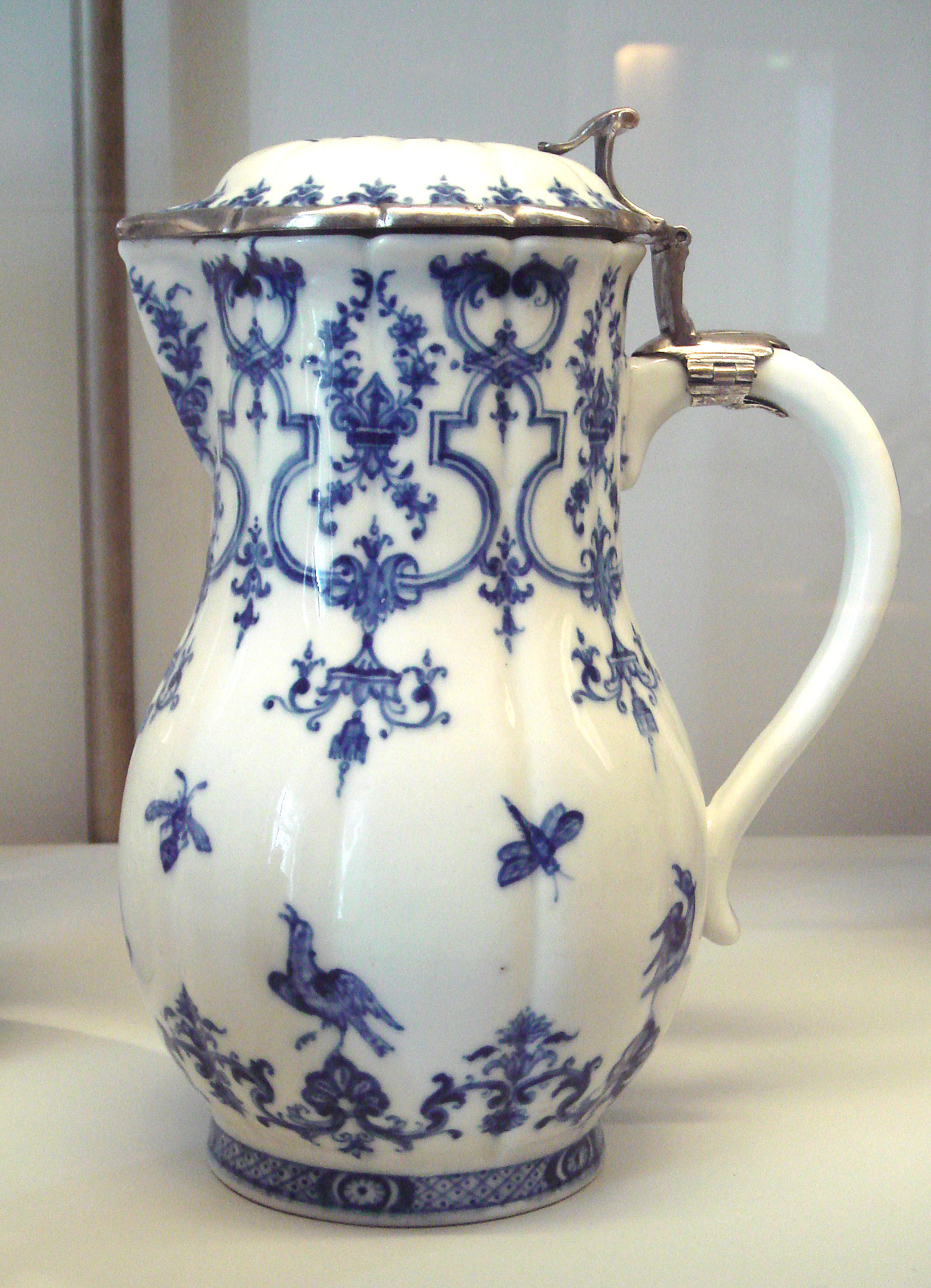
Saint-Cloud soft porcelain water pot, circa 1725, with silver mount (1726–1732)

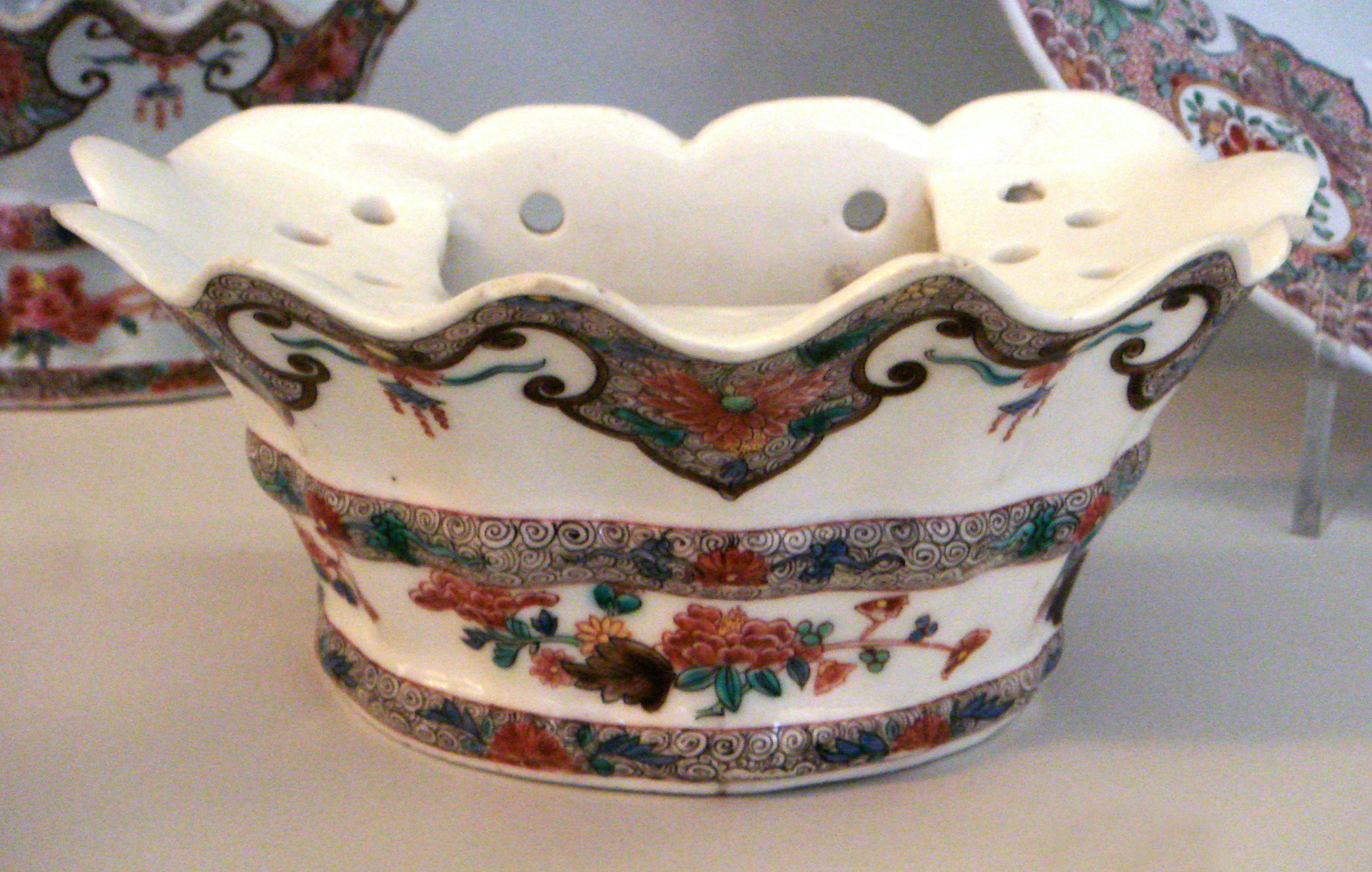
Saint-Cloud soft paste porcelain flower holder, "famille rose", 1730–1740

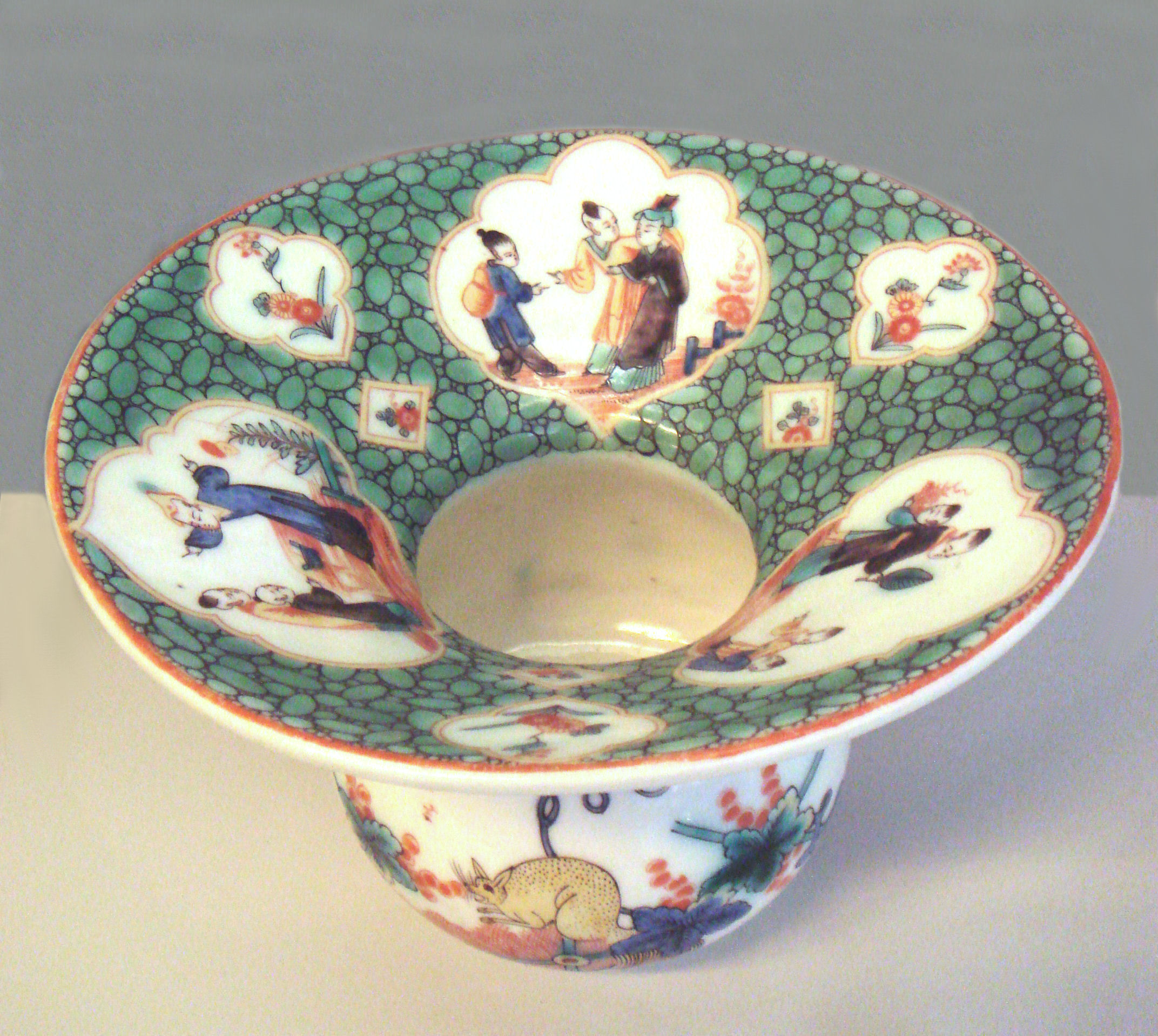
Saint-Cloud soft porcelain spitting bowl, "famille verte", 1730–1740

== Later designs ==
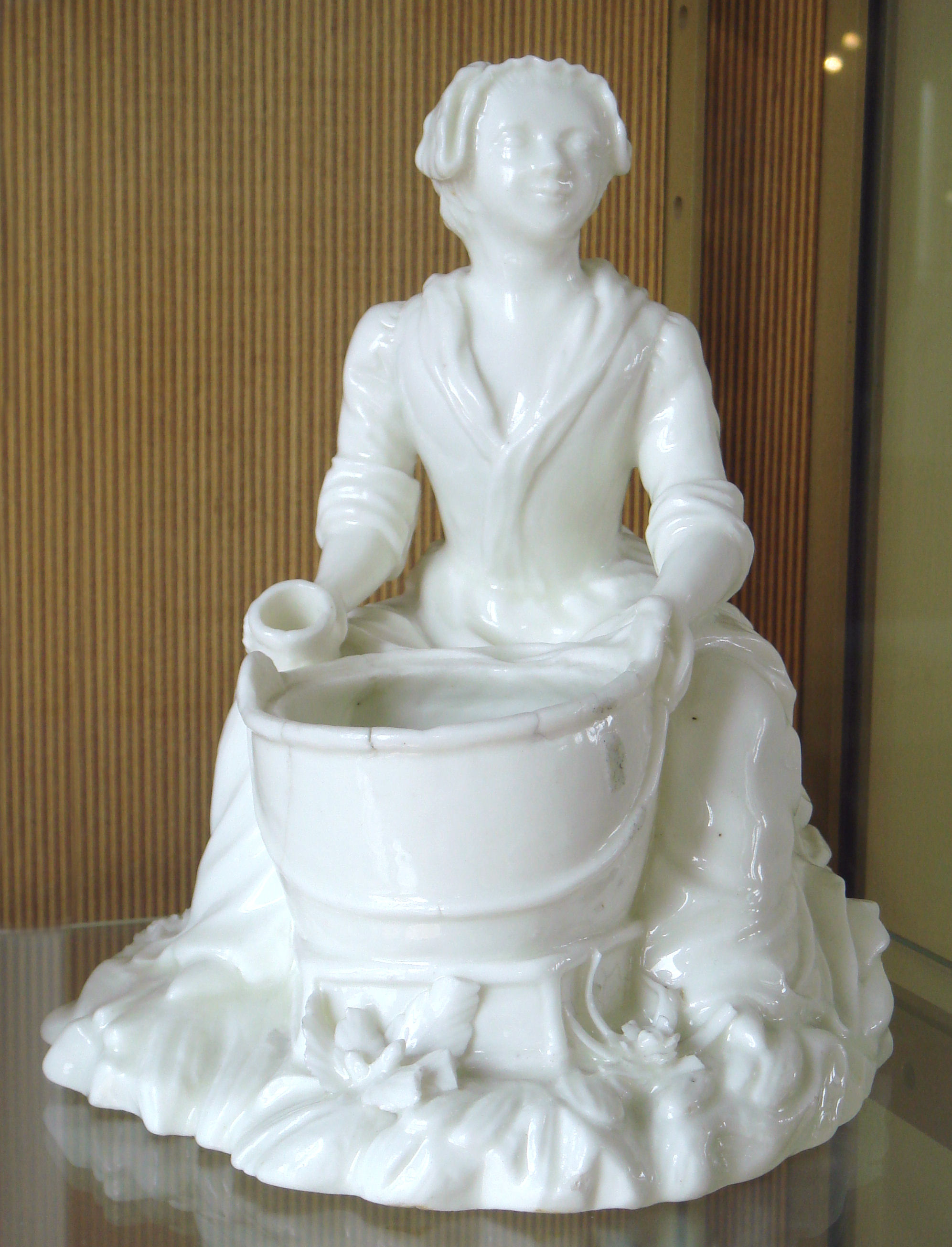
Saint-Cloud soft paste porcelain, 1720–1740

In its later years, Saint-Cloud also produced various designs which were less Asian in character, especially with some white soft-paste porcelain wares. After 1752, Vincennes porcelain was handed a monopoly of polychrome decors, which reduced the scope of other manufactories to some degree.

Production continued until 1766, when competition from the Chantilly and Sèvres porcelain manufactories put Saint-Cloud out of business.

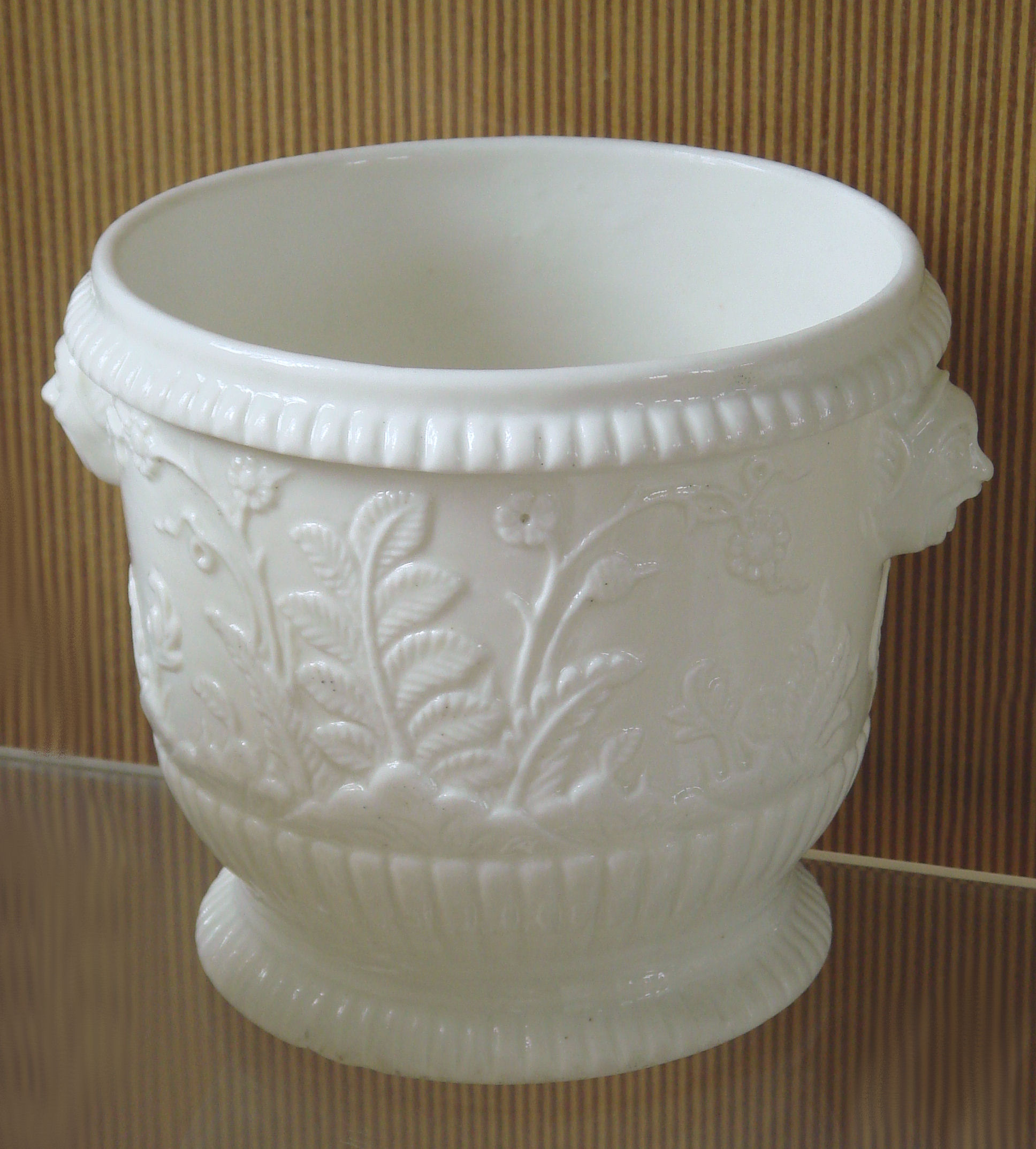
Saint-Cloud soft-paste porcelain seau, 18th century

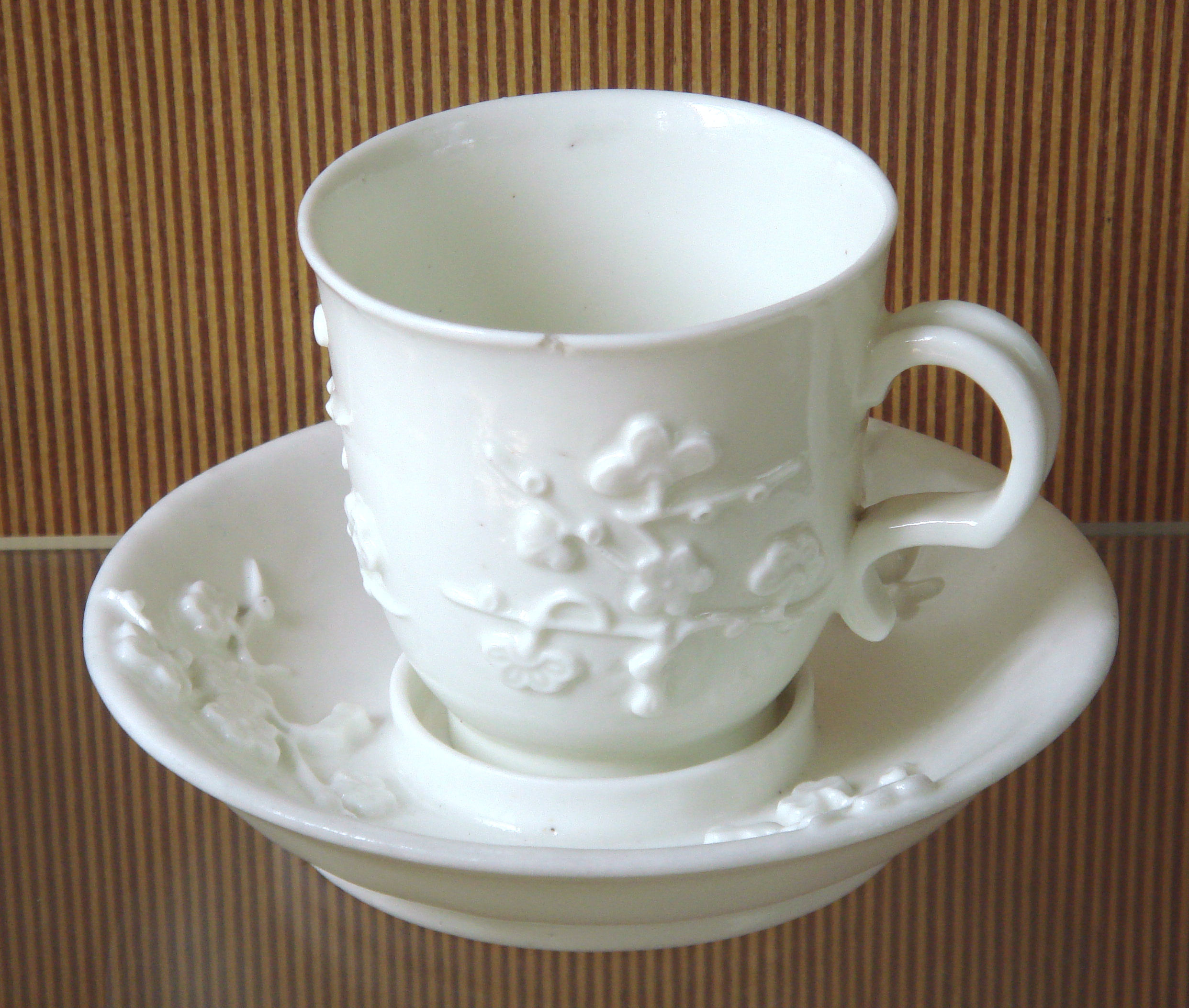
Saint-Cloud soft-paste porcelain teacup, 18th century

== See also ==
- Orientalism in early modern France
