= Swan Service =

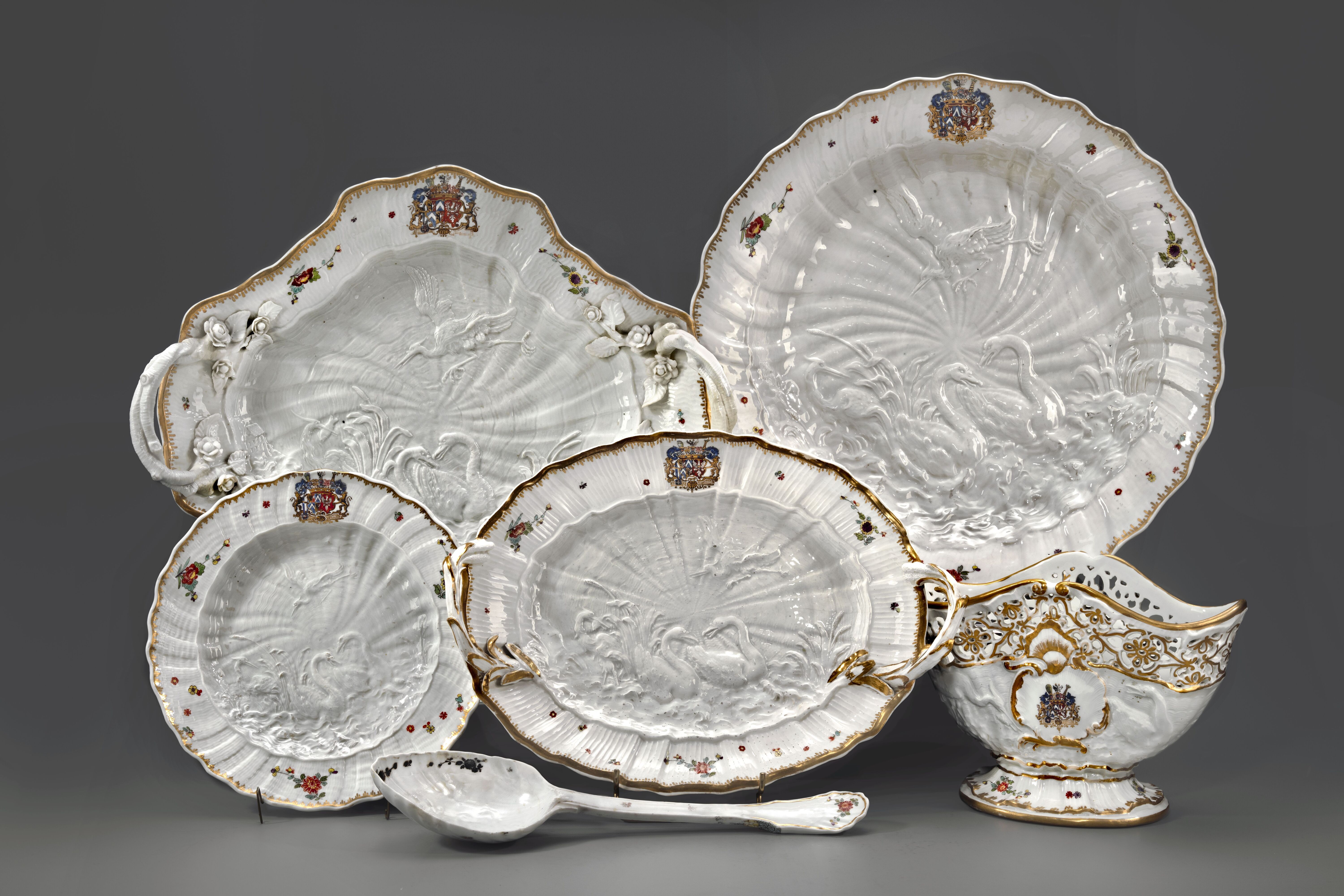
Swan Service in the National Museum in Warsaw

The Swan Service (German: Schwanenservice, Polish: Serwis łabędzi) is a large service of baroque Meissen porcelain which was made for the First Minister of the Electorate of Saxony and favourite of King Augustus III of Poland, Heinrich von Brühl. Augustus had made Brühl the Supervisor of the Meissen works in 1733, then in August 1739 its director. The Swan Service has been called "the most famous high baroque production in Meissen porcelain", "a triumph of modelling and firing", and "the most fabulous tableware conceived in porcelain". After earlier work with prototypes, the Meissen designers and modellers Johann Joachim Kändler, Johann Friedrich Eberlein and (from about 1741) Johann Gottlieb Ehder created the service, which consists of over 2,200 individual pieces, between 1737 and 1741 or 1742.

== Motifs ==
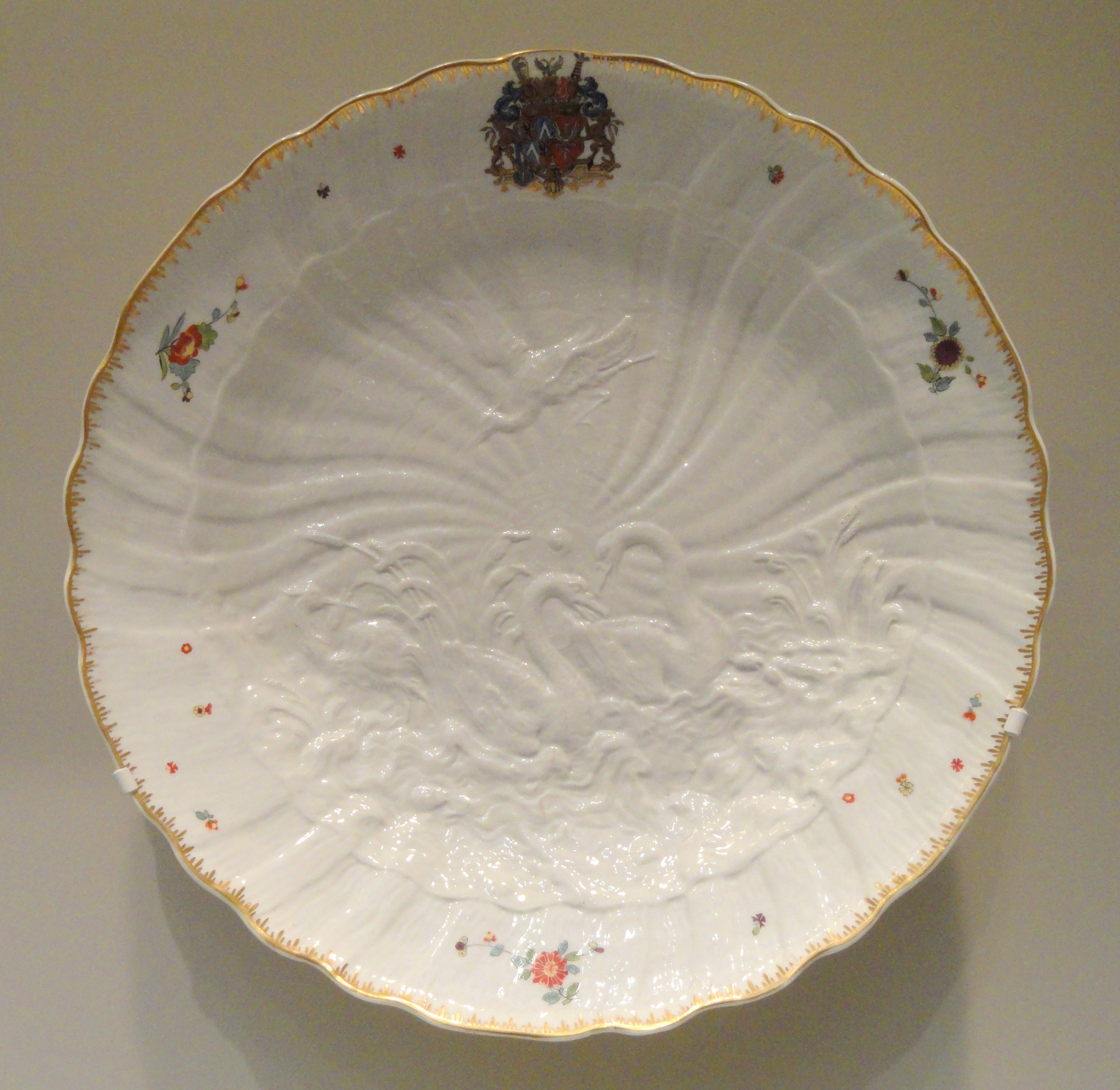
Surviving plate from the Swan Service, ca. 1738

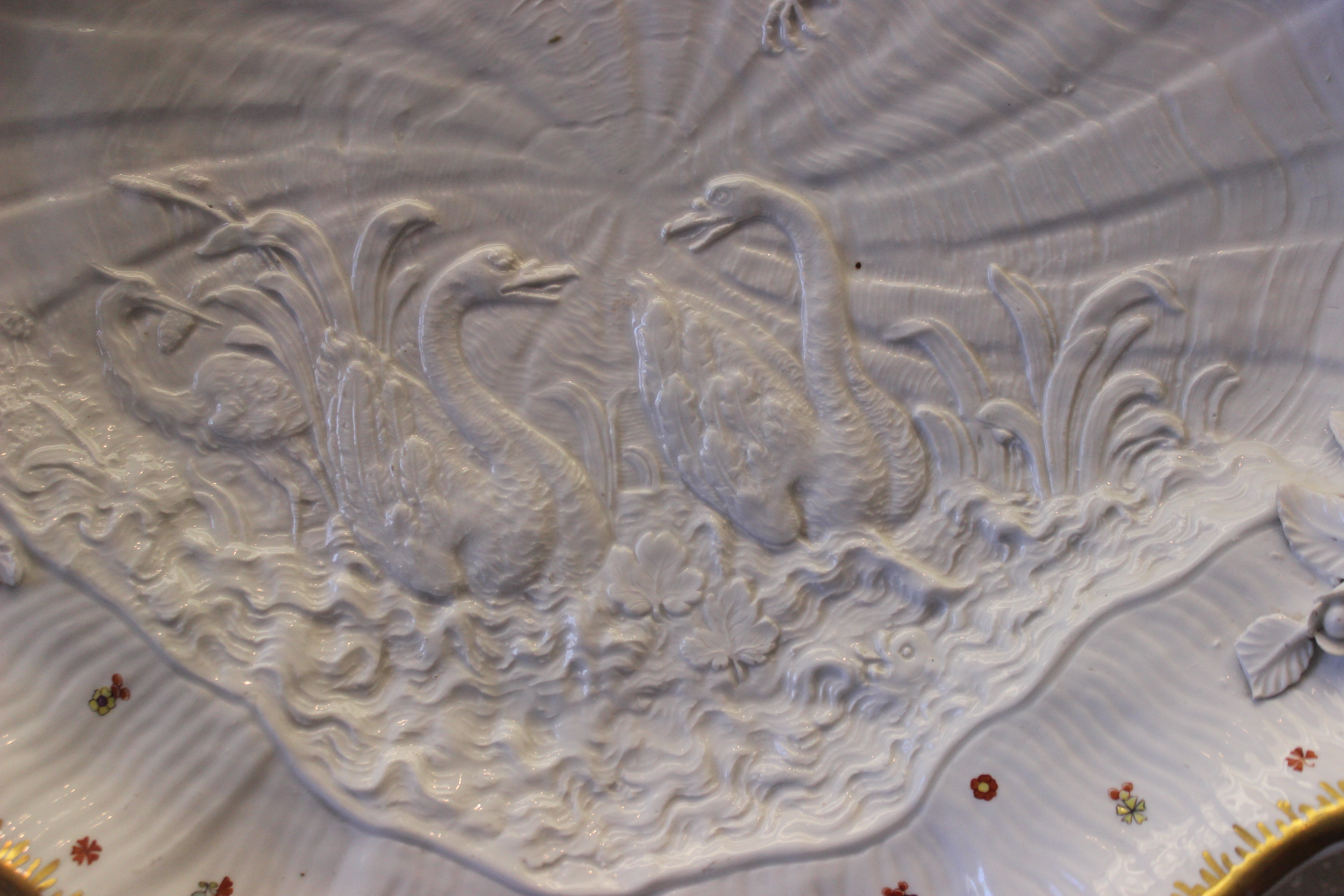
Detail of a tureen stand, with the swan motif

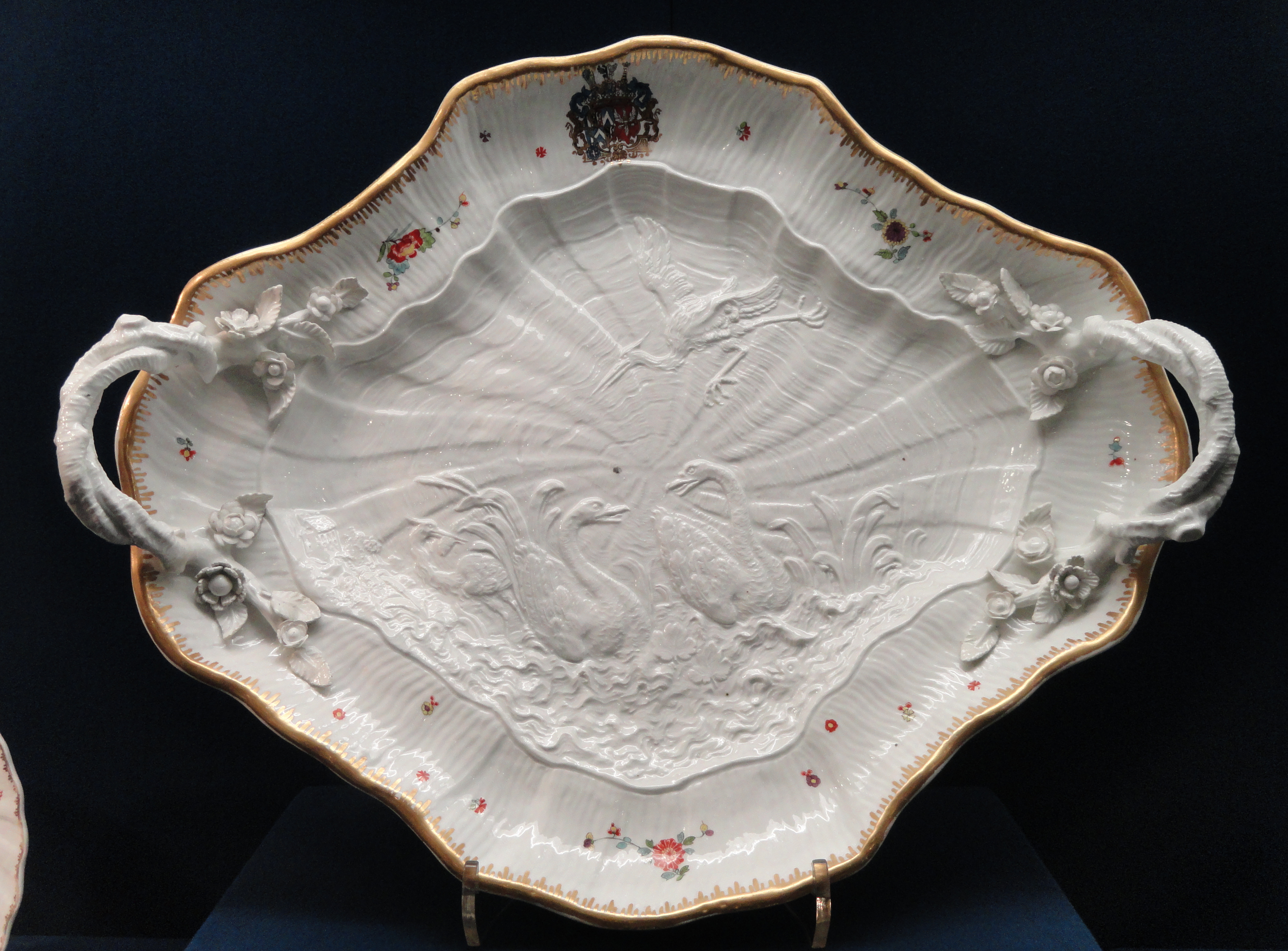
Stand for a tureen, c. 1737–41

A service on such a scale and with such lavish sculptural elements was unprecedented; a later large Meissen service, the Möllendorff Dinner Service of the 1760s had fewer than 1,000 pieces. The distinctive characteristic of the service, from which it gets its name, is its decoration in very low relief: each plate or other piece of flatware has a delicate background with radiating bands based on a scallop shell, against which there is in the central well a pair of swans on the water amid bullrushes, and a crane in the air, descending to join another on the left. The standing crane grasps a fish in his beak, and the head of another fish can be seen in the water beneath the swan on the right. Brühl in German means a damp, marshy place, so the theme of the service was a play on its owner's name.

In January 1738 Kändler spent three days in the royal natural history collection at Dresden, where "I drew all sorts of shells and examined them closely, so that the ... service could be realized in the most natural manner". Such relief backgrounds were a speciality of Meissen under Kändler, but were usually more geometrical, as in the "osier" patterns, imitating wickerwork, or the "Dulong border" (from 1743) with a rather neoclassical plant-scroll pattern.

Large pieces include opulent centrepieces, numerous candelabra, tureens. There are other items including teapots and cups and wall-sconces as well as the standard items of dinnerware. The decoration, apart from the small painted flowers of the pattern called indianische Blumen ("Indian flowers"), is themed around water and the life within, though often mixing fresh water and marine forms. Several parts of the service depict figures from Greco-Roman mythology, like Glaucus and the dolphin-riding Galatea. Almost all pieces of the original service bear the painted impaled coat of arms of Heinrich von Brühl and his wife, countess Franziska Kolowrat-Krakowsky, though pieces were also produced for other customers. Other painted decoration on the flatware pieces is gold rims and small flowers; the figures on the larger pieces are more fully painted.

== History ==
Brühl was a loyal minister, who was allowed, as director, to commission and receive Meissen pieces free (unlike the king himself, who owned the Meissen factory). He made use of this privilege, although the Swan Service seems to have been a wedding present from the king for Brühl's marriage in November 1737. Brühl's level of entertaining was exceptional even for the period, and the service à la française used at the time required large numbers of pieces of tableware, especially for Brühl, who served 80 to 100 different dishes at every "publick entertainment."

Work was begun by Kändler in 1736, when some sample plates were produced. Fabrication of the moulds began in December 1737, and most shapes were completed by 1741; the service was delivered piecemeal as pieces were finished. Meissen still possesses the moulds, and these were used at the time and later to produce items outside the Brühl service itself, including some in limited editions today. Mostly, these lack the armorials.

Except for those pieces of the service that were on museum loan in Dresden, all other pieces of the service were lost during the last stages of World War II, when the approaching Soviet Red Army set ablaze Schloss Pförten, the family castle in today's Brody, Żary County in western Poland. It is said that the surviving pieces hidden in the castle's cellars were used by Soviet soldiers as targets in a version of clay pigeon shooting. Today, many museums have items from it, with a trickle of pieces from the original production still appearing on the art market. London auction prices in 2015 include £31,250 for a teacup and saucer, £18,125 for a slop bowl, £6,875 for small fragments of three candlesticks, £15,000 for a saucer and £8,125 for a mustard-pot cover.

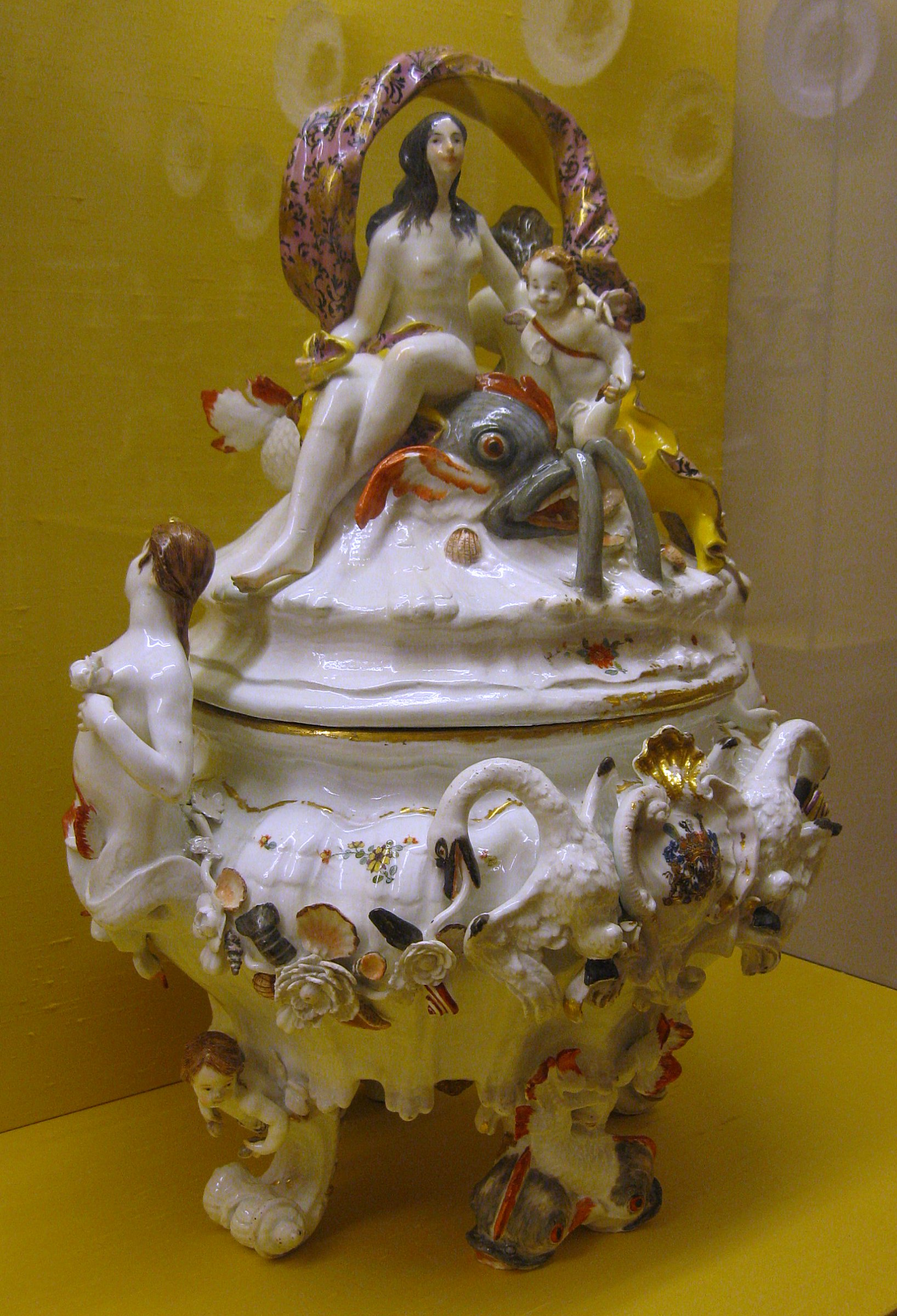
Tureen

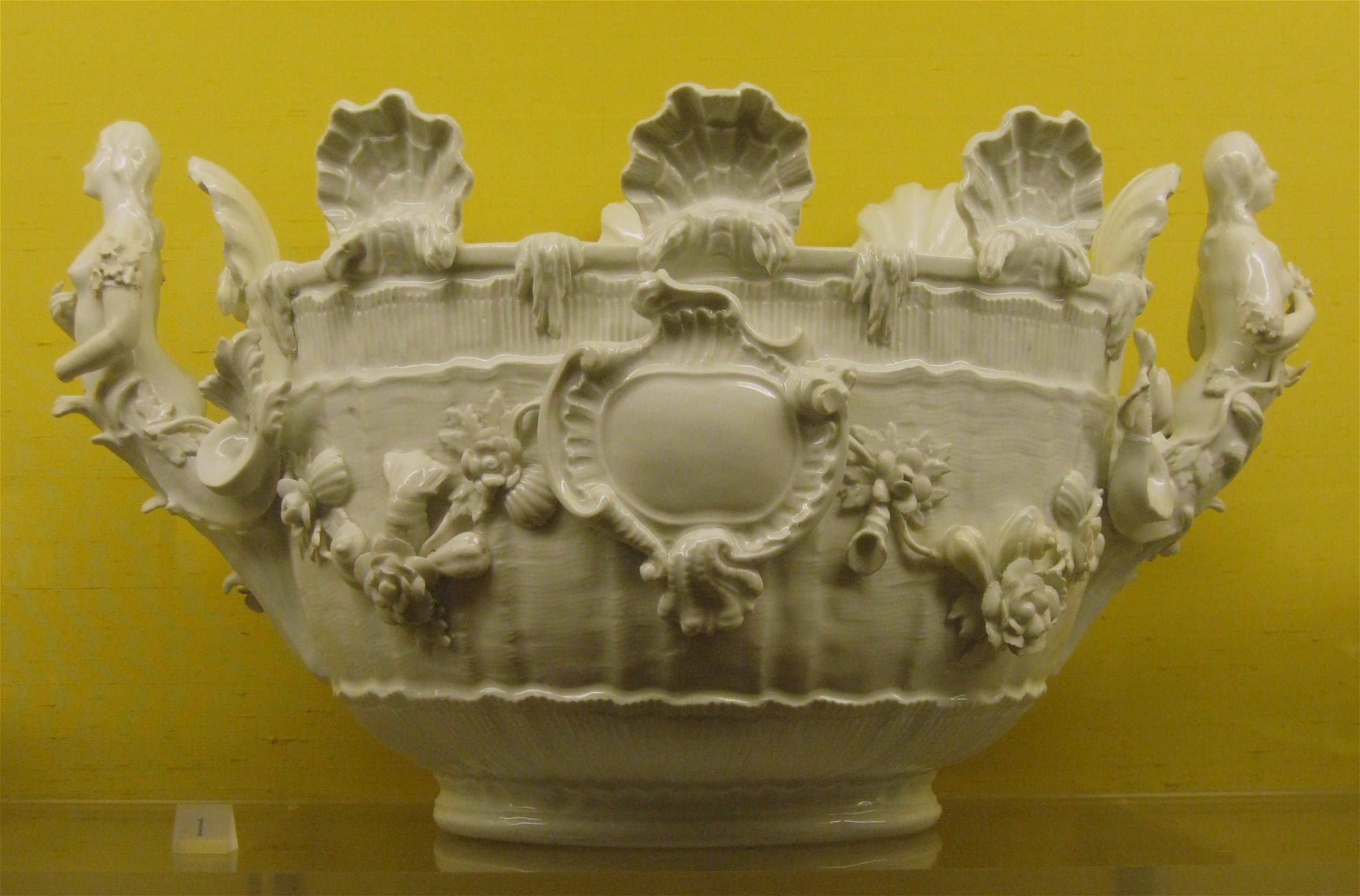
unpainted wine-cooler, J.F.Eberlein, 1740–41

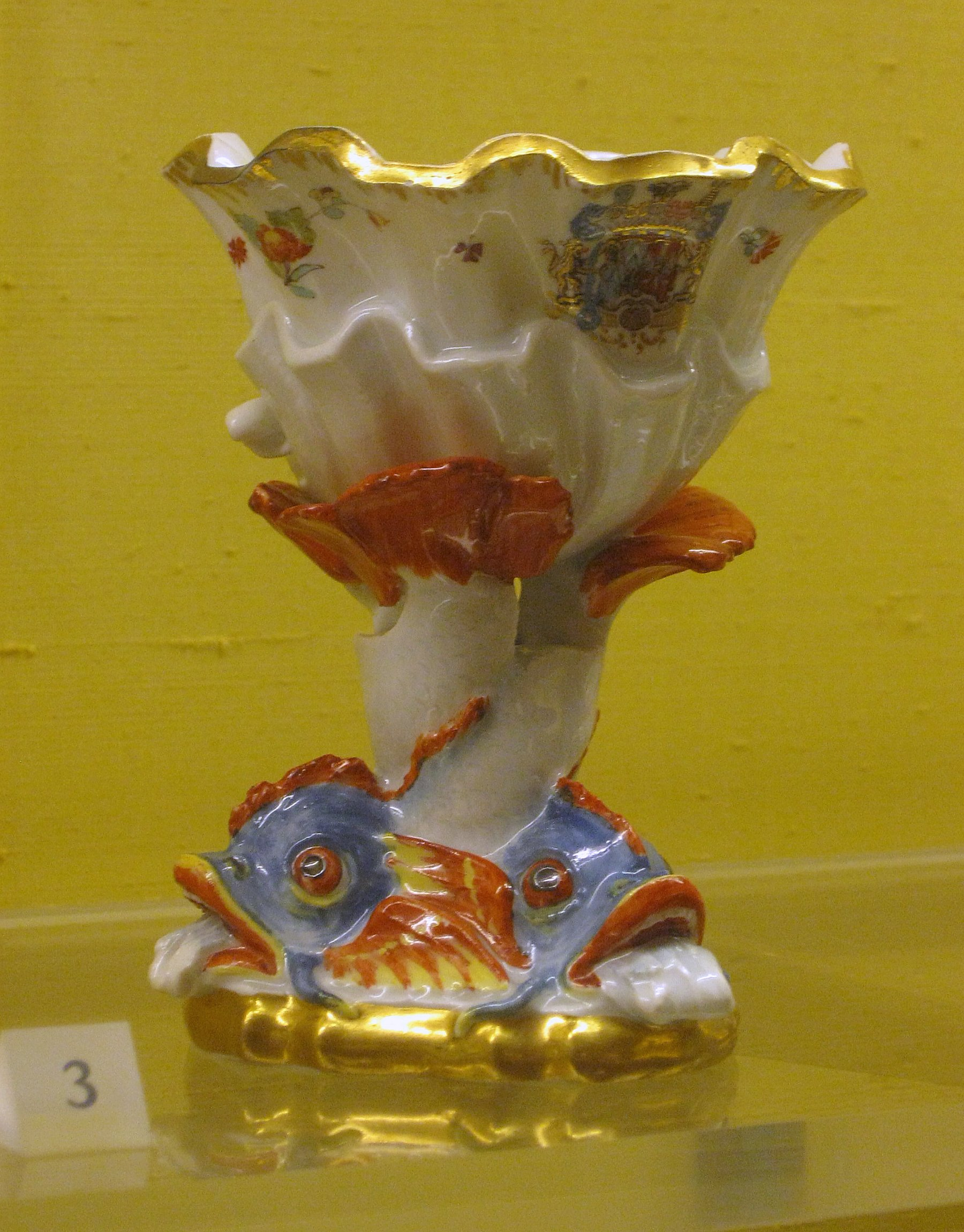
Salt cellar

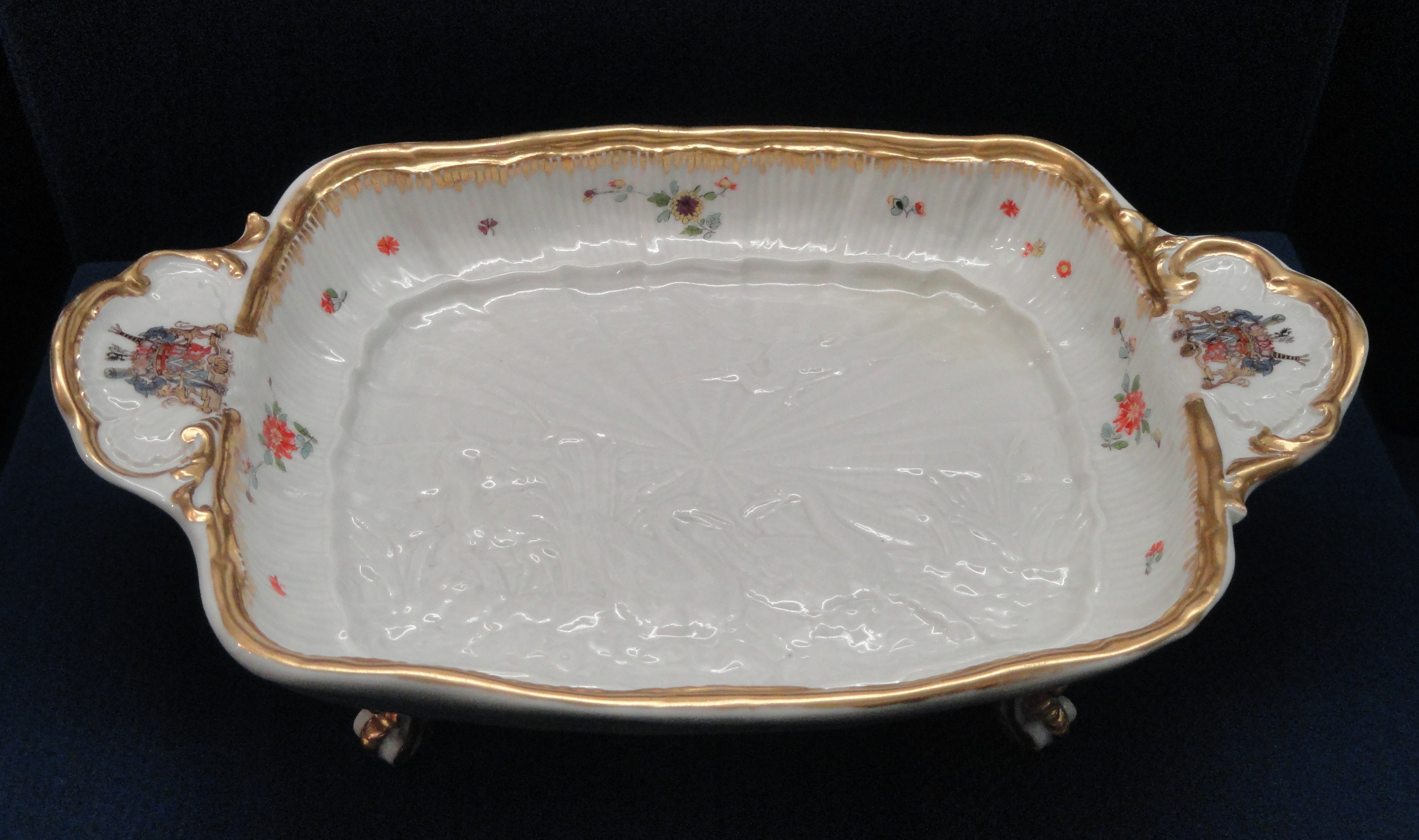
Confectionery dish, c. 1737–41

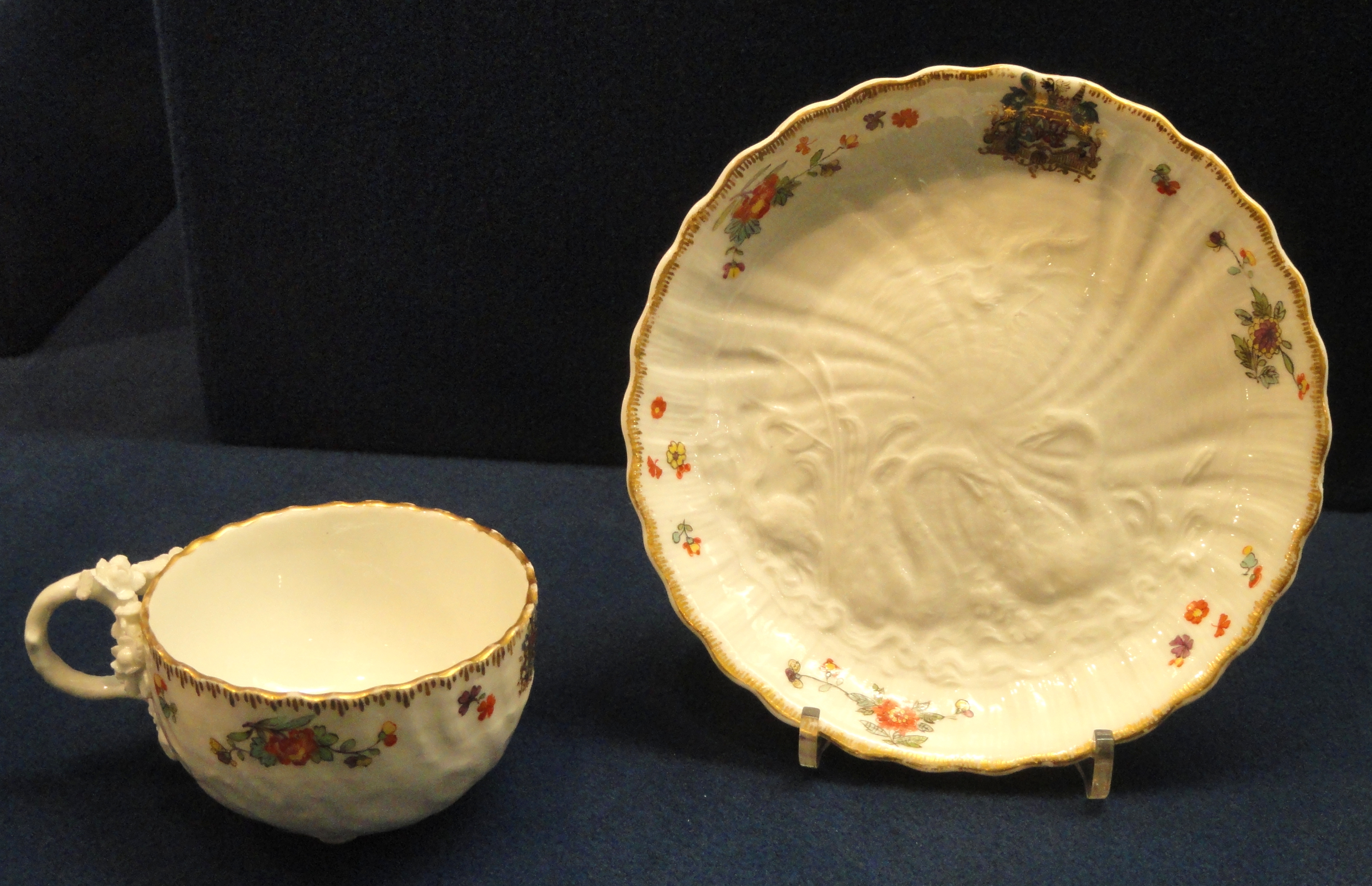
Teacup and saucer, c. 1737–41

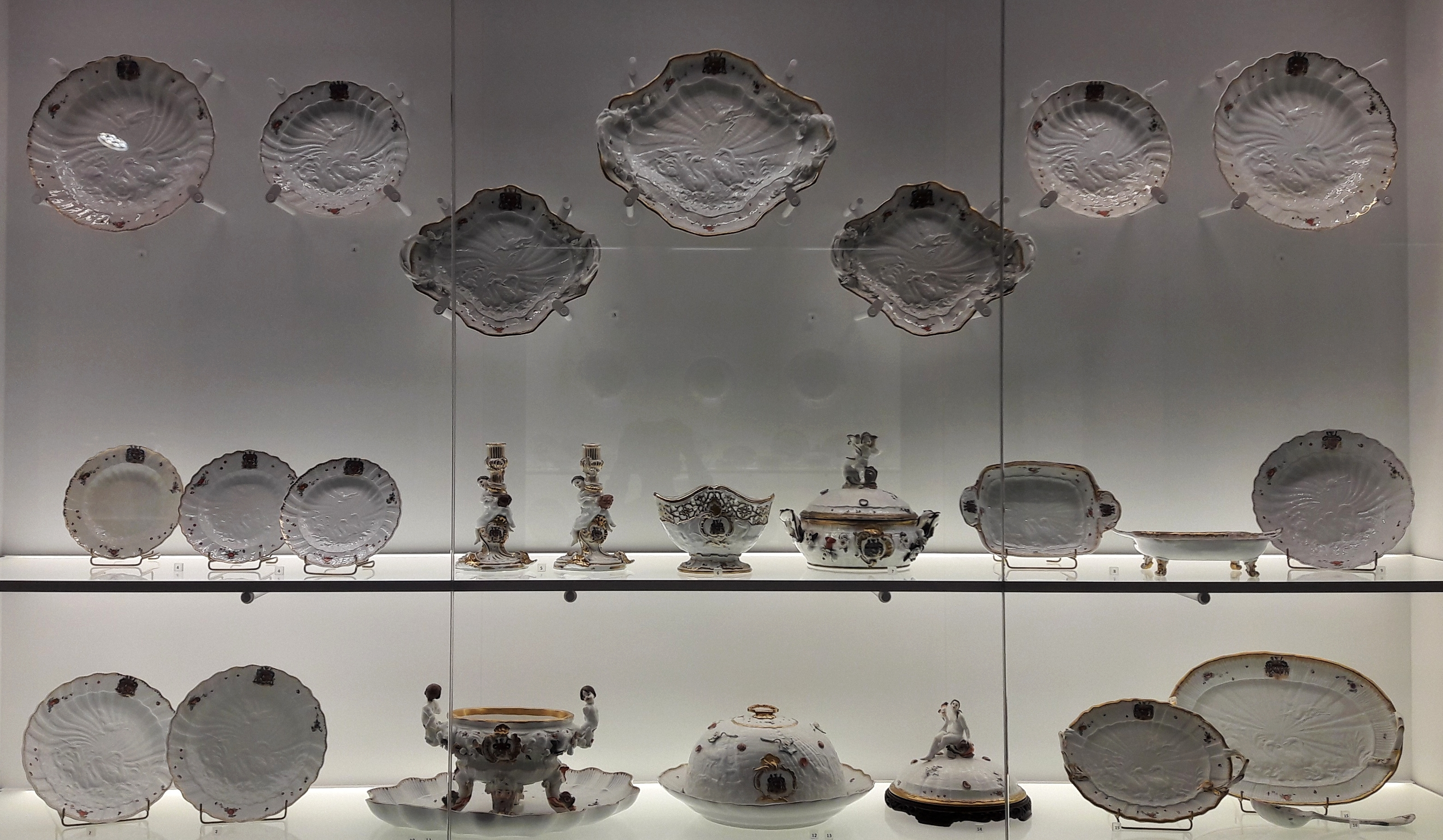
Display in the National Museum, Warsaw

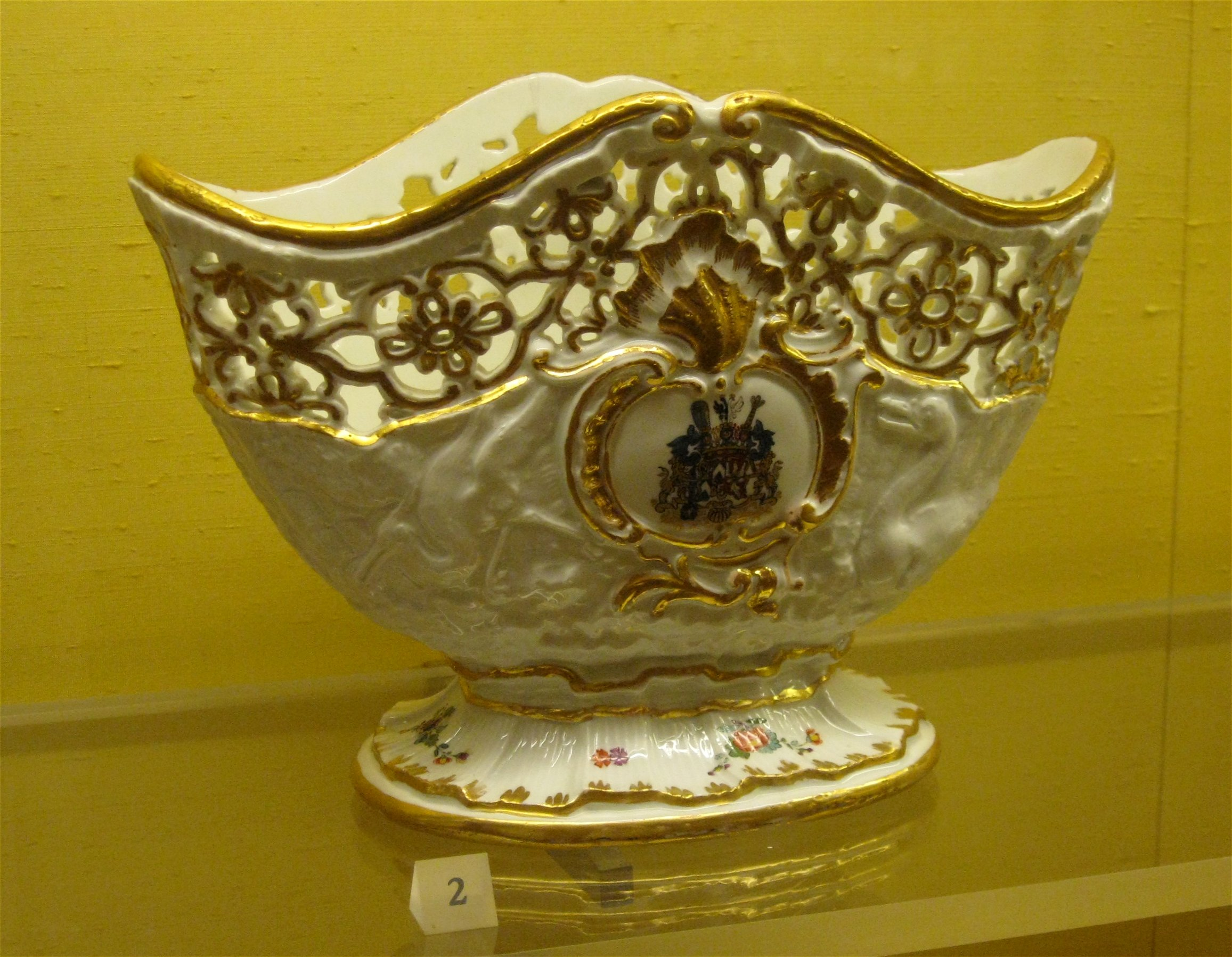
Wine-cooler by J.F.Eberlein, 1741

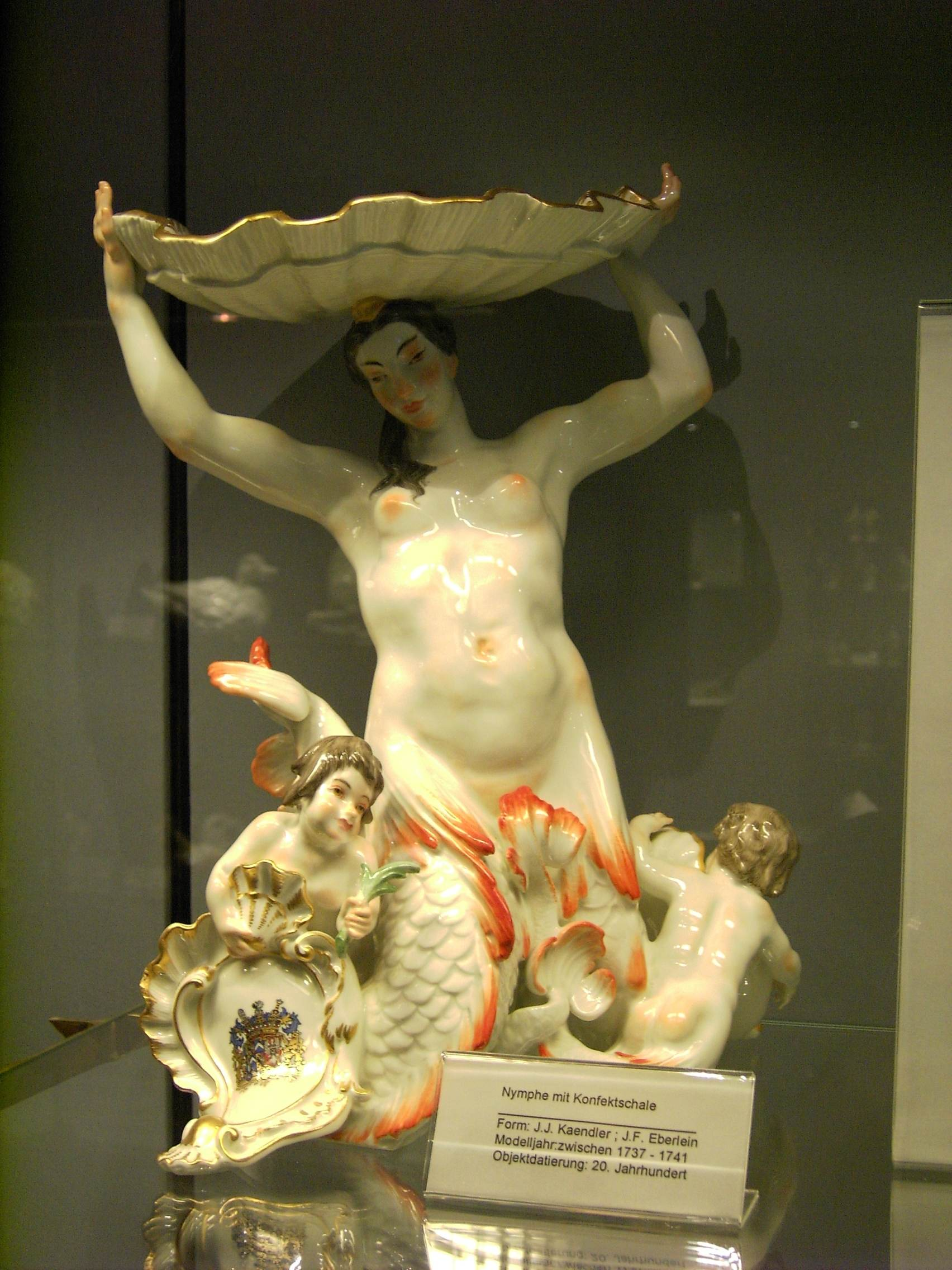
Nymph on a dish for sweets, with the Brühl coat of arms, but a 20th-century production

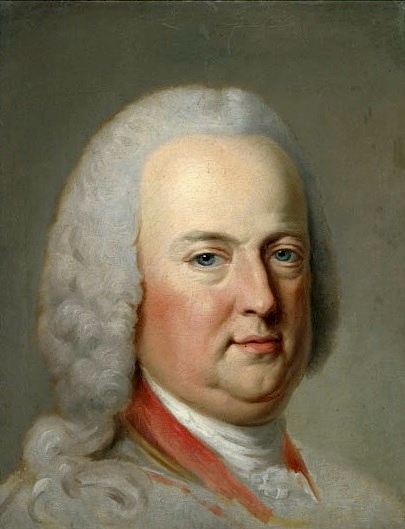
Heinrich von Brühl by Marcello Bacciarelli, 1758–63
