= Osier pattern =

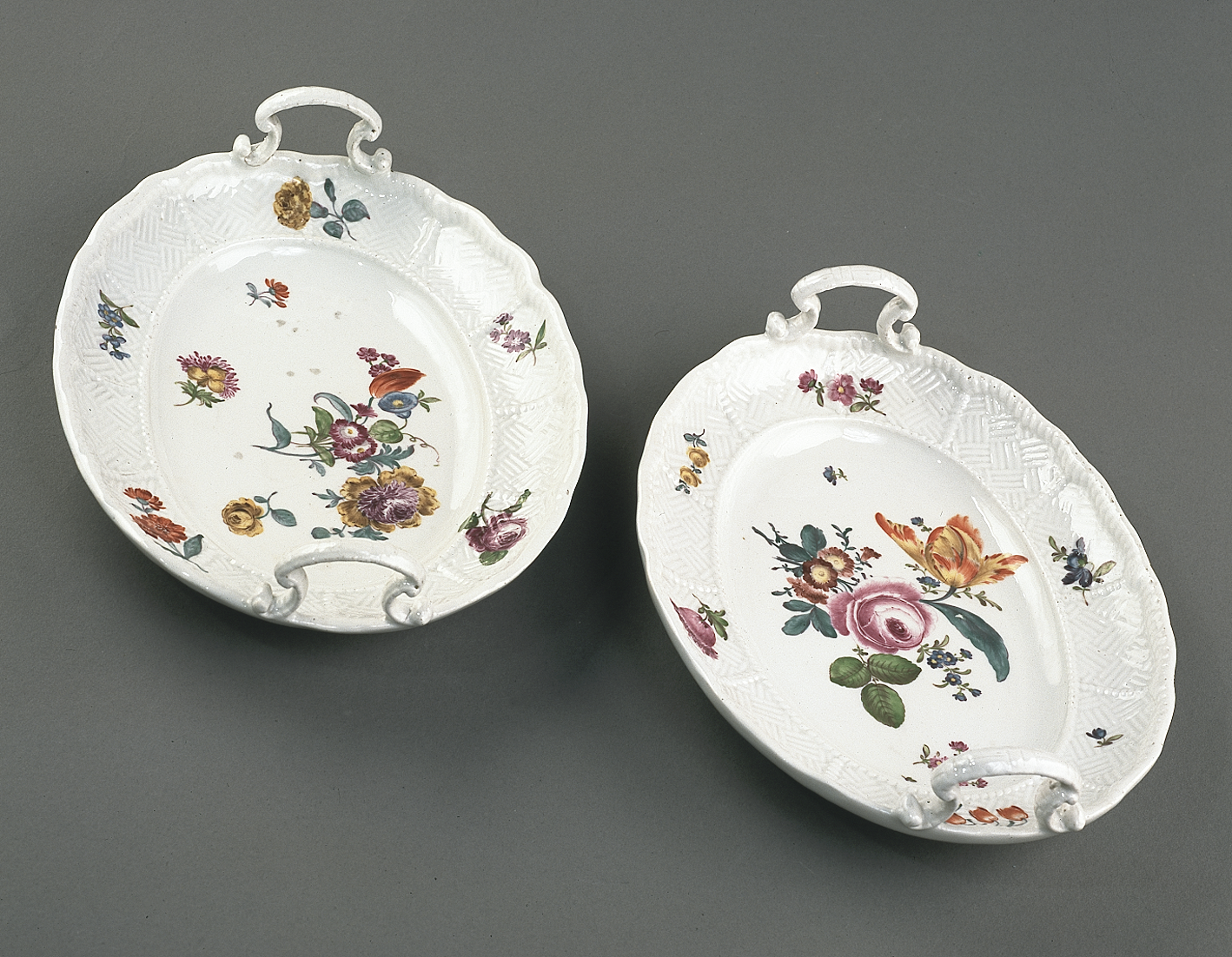
Two "osier pattern" dishes of the first "Sulkowski" type, Meissen, 1755–60

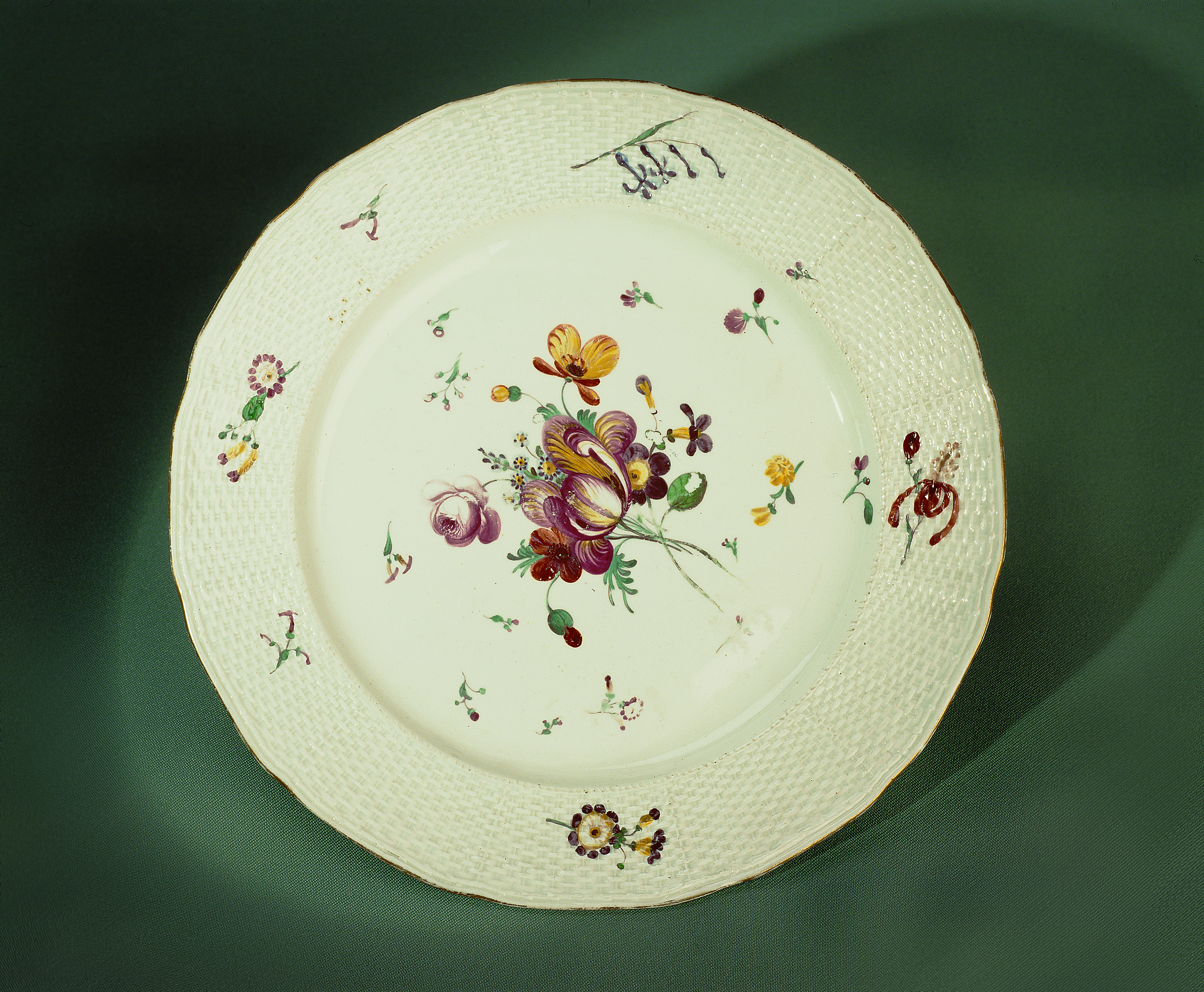
Frankenthal porcelain imitation of the "old osier" pattern, with minimal vertical bands

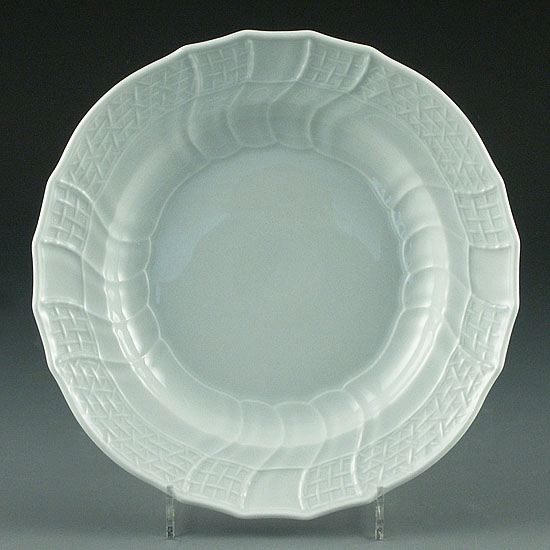
A version of the third type "New Osier", known as "Brandenstein-Relief". Modern plate.

In tableware the Osier pattern is a moulded basket-weave pattern in delicate relief used round the borders of porcelain plates and other pieces of flatware. It originated in Germany in the 1730s on Meissen porcelain, and was later often imitated by other producers. It is presumed to have been devised by Johann Joachim Kaendler, the celebrated head modeller at Meissen. The name comes from Salix viminalis, or the common osier (ozier in German), a Eurasian species of willow, whose thin, flexible, shoots or withies were and are much used for various types of wickerwork, usually encouraged by coppicing the plants.

Such relief backgrounds were a speciality of Meissen under Kändler, as in the "Dulong border" (from 1743) with a rather neoclassical plant-scroll pattern, and, most spectacular of all, the decoration of the famous Swan Service, where each plate or other piece of flatware has a delicate background with radiating bands based on a scallop shell, against which there is in the central well a pair of swans on the water amid bullrushes, and a crane in the air, descending to join another on the left. The standing crane grasps a fish in his beak, and the head of another fish can be seen in the water beneath the swan on the right.

In fact Meissen used three versions of the osier borders, with several minor variations between different moulds. The first type, produced from about 1732, and widely used in a dinner service for Count Alexander Joseph Sulkowski of about 1735, is called the "ordinar ozier" ("ordinary osier") or Sulkowski type. It has small groups of shoots diagonal to the edge of the plate, forming squares with the adjacent groups at right angles. These are all set between straight vertical bands at regular intervals. The inner and outer boundaries of the osier decoration may be marked by striated bands, also imitating woven basketwork.

Not long after, a version was introduced with finer shoots, all going in the same direction parallel with the edge of the plate, and not always having the vertical strips, which as before are straight. After the final version was introduced in 1742, this second one was known as the "Altozier" or "old ozier", and the third one as the "Neuozier" or "new osier". The Neuozier pattern was a "more rococo version with spiral ribs". In this type the vertical strips or ribs curve into a sort of "S" shape, are given more emphasis, and often come into the central well of the plate, projecting beyond the basket-weave, which may cover only about half of the raised border of the plate. The inner boundary of the decoration is marked by a raised ridge. Both old and new types continued to be produced, up to the present day. The central well of the plate is left plain, except in the new type, and many larger pieces that are not flat (cups, pots and tureens for example) lack the relief pattern.

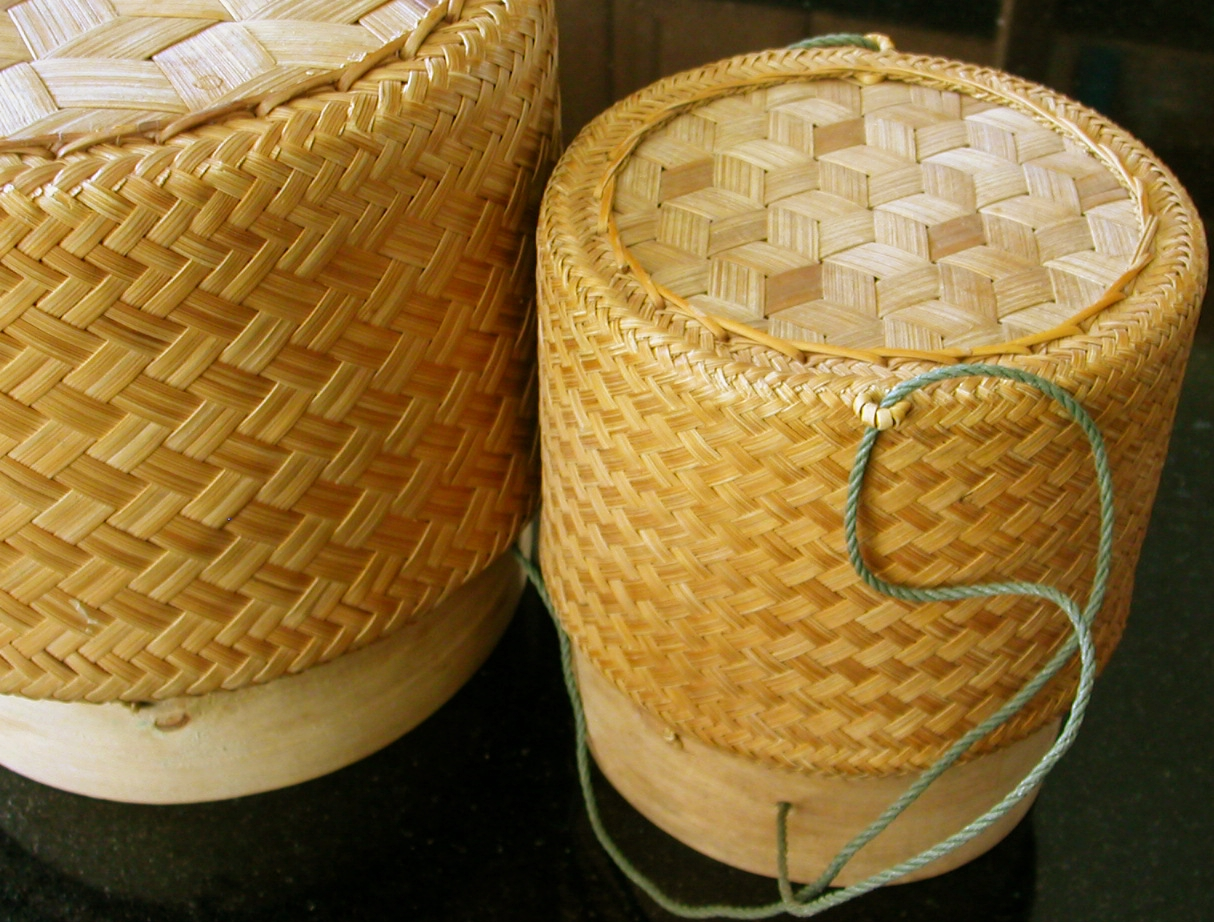
Lao ricebasket; the sort of weave imitated in the first "Sulkowski" type

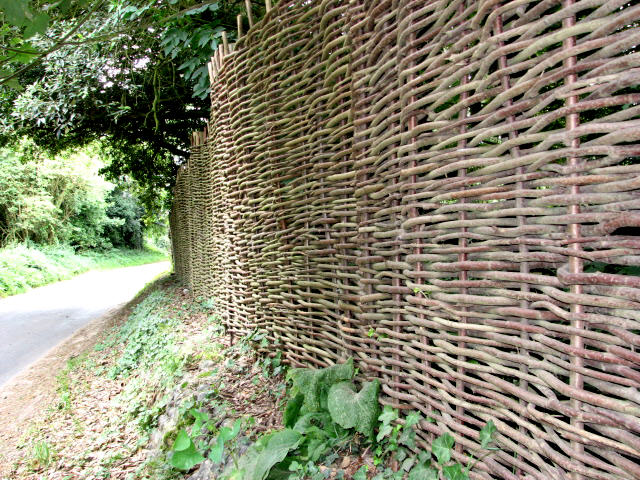
Wicker fence with the sort of weave imitated in the "old osier" pattern

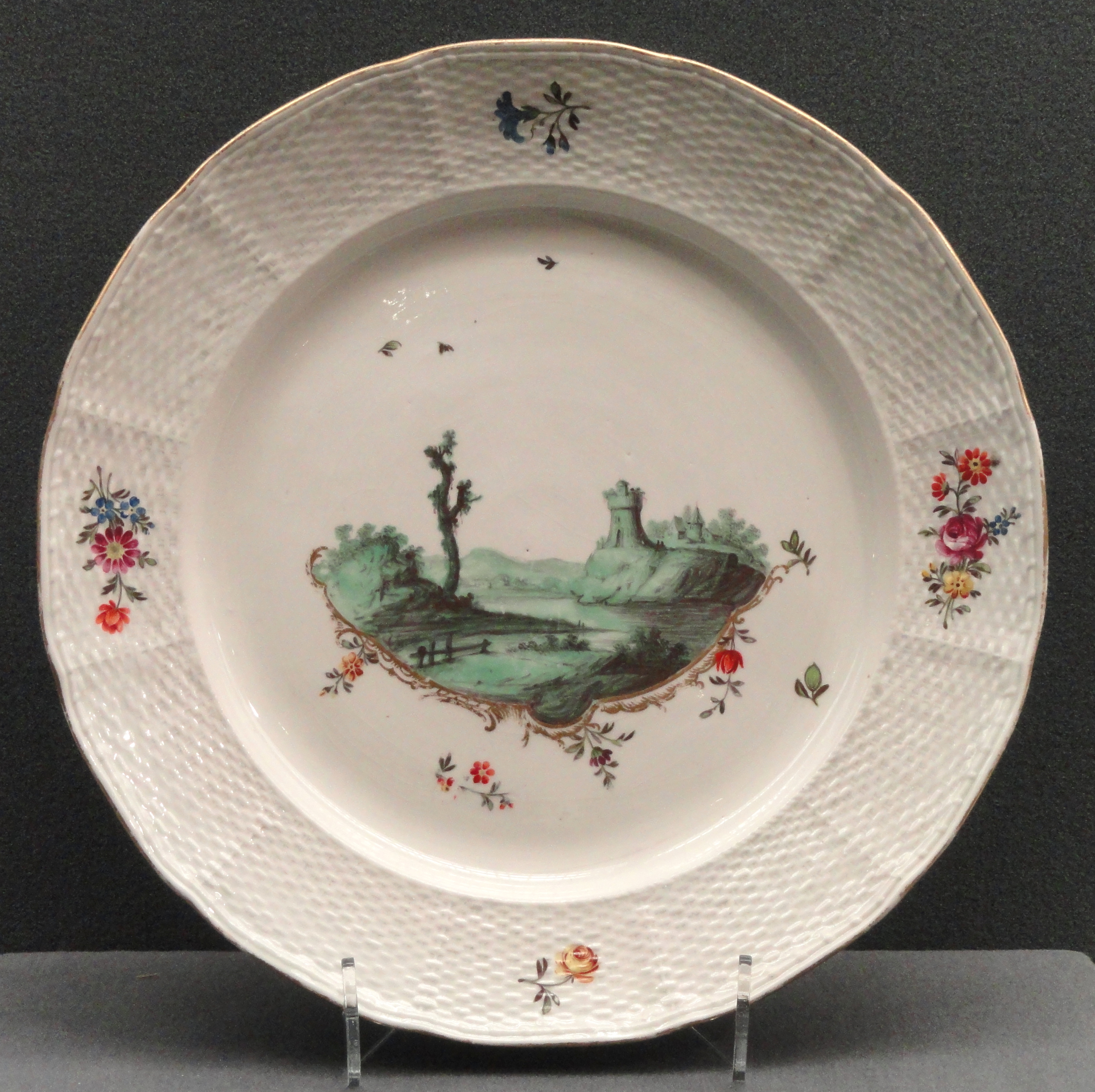
Frankenthal porcelain imitation of the "old osier" pattern, with minimal vertical bands

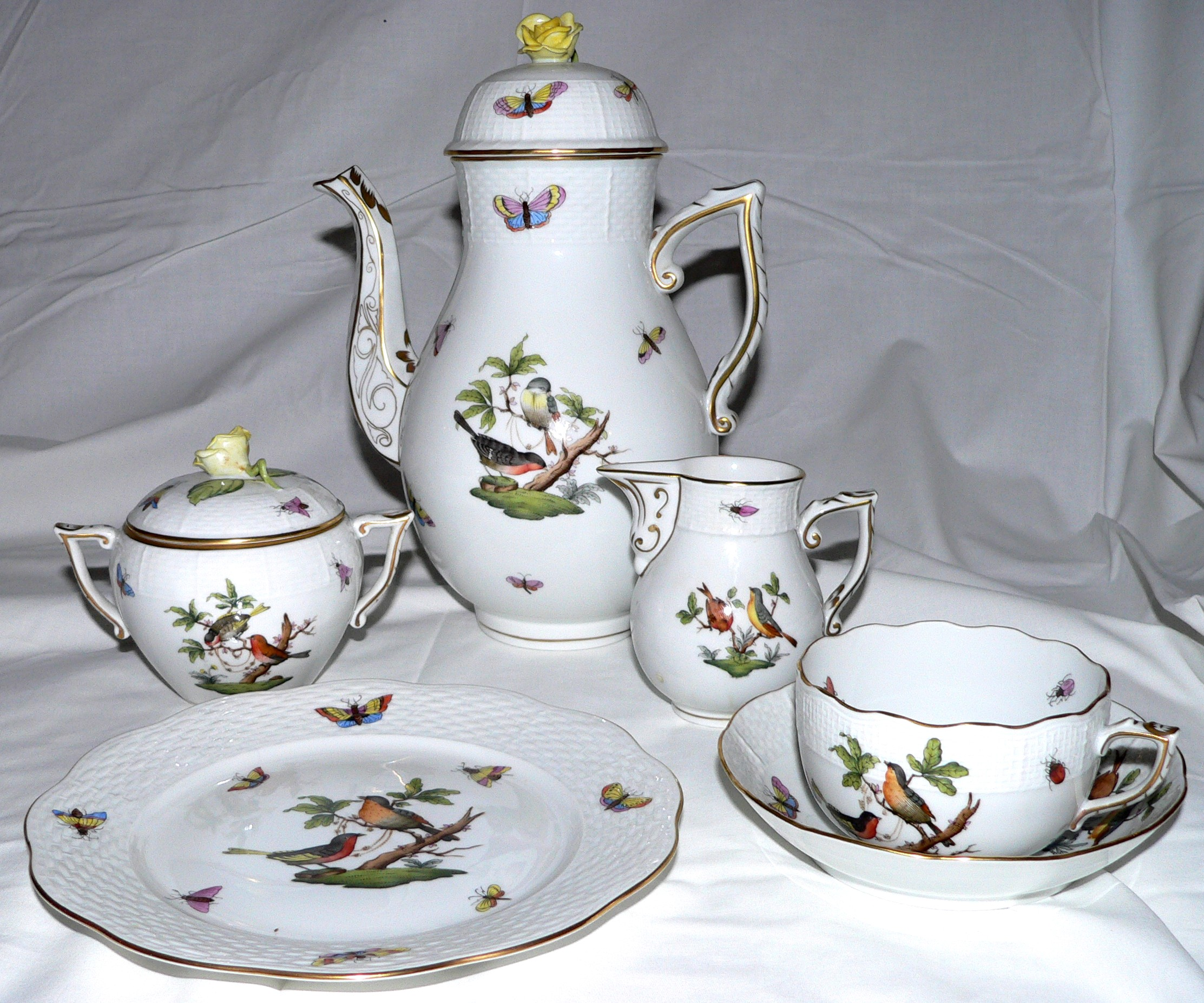
Herend porcelain set with the osier pattern.
