= Frankenthal Porcelain Factory =

18th Century German porcelain manufacturer

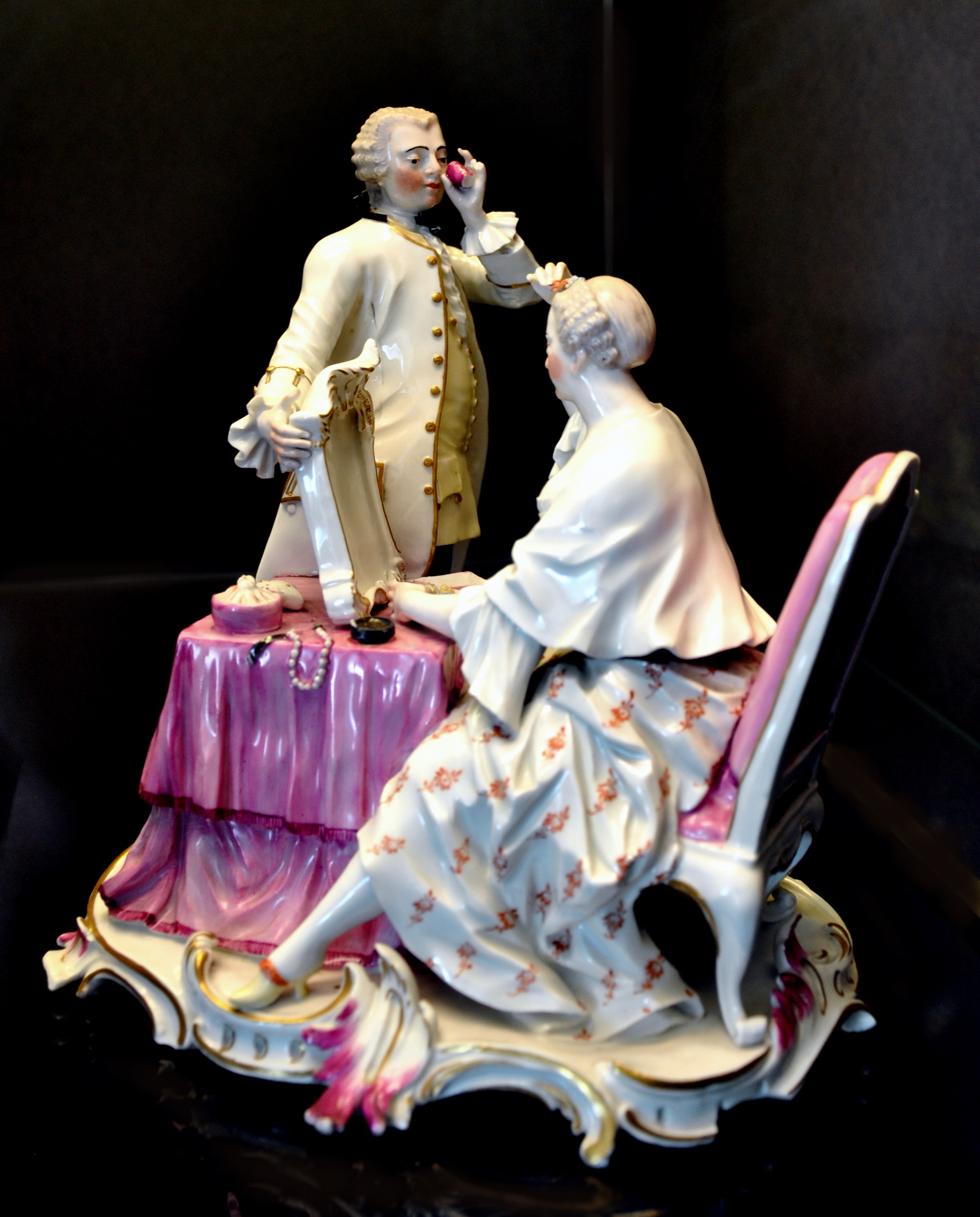
Frankenthal porcelain group, c. 1760

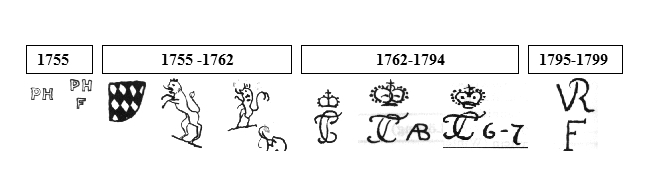
Frankenthal porcelain marks

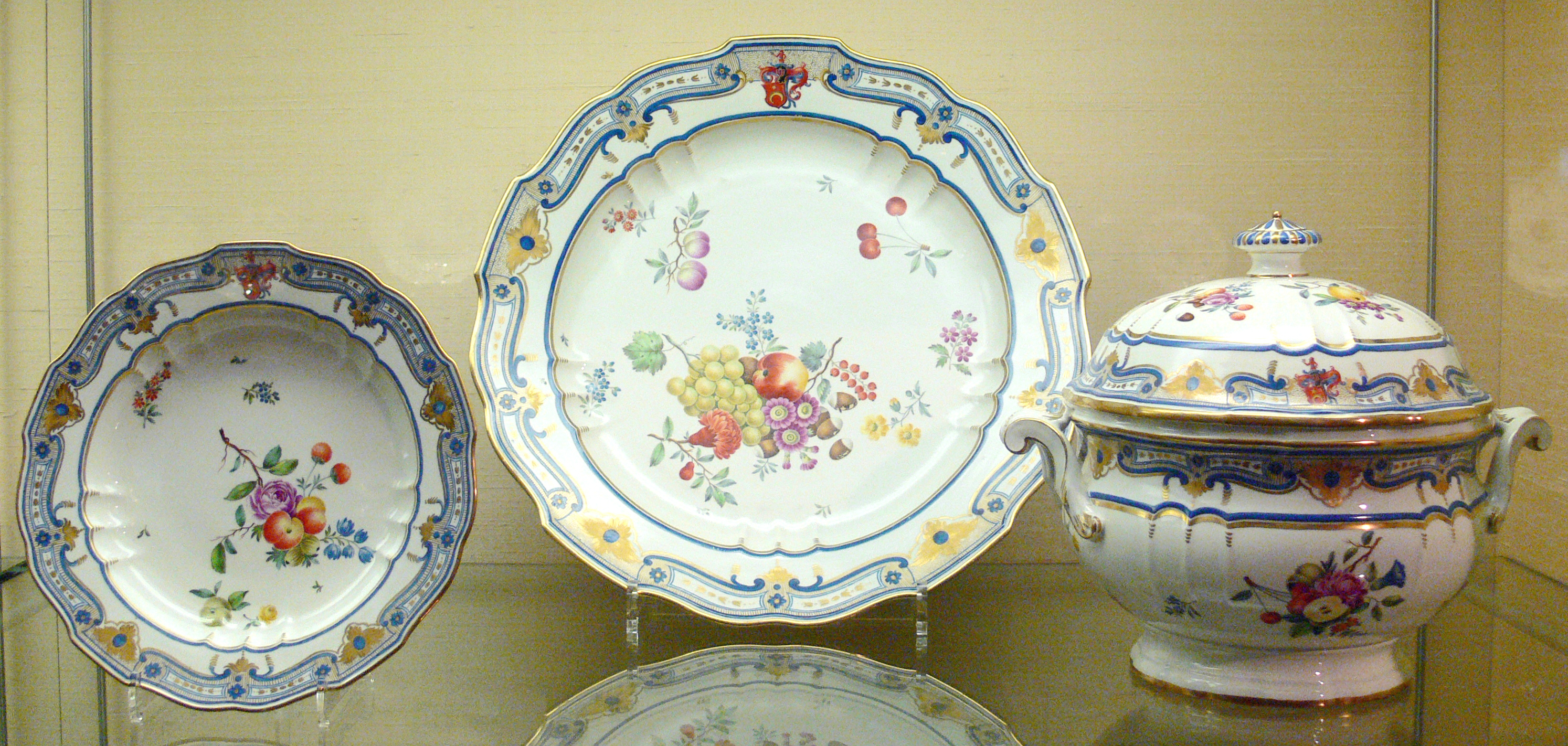
Pieces from a dinner service of 1782

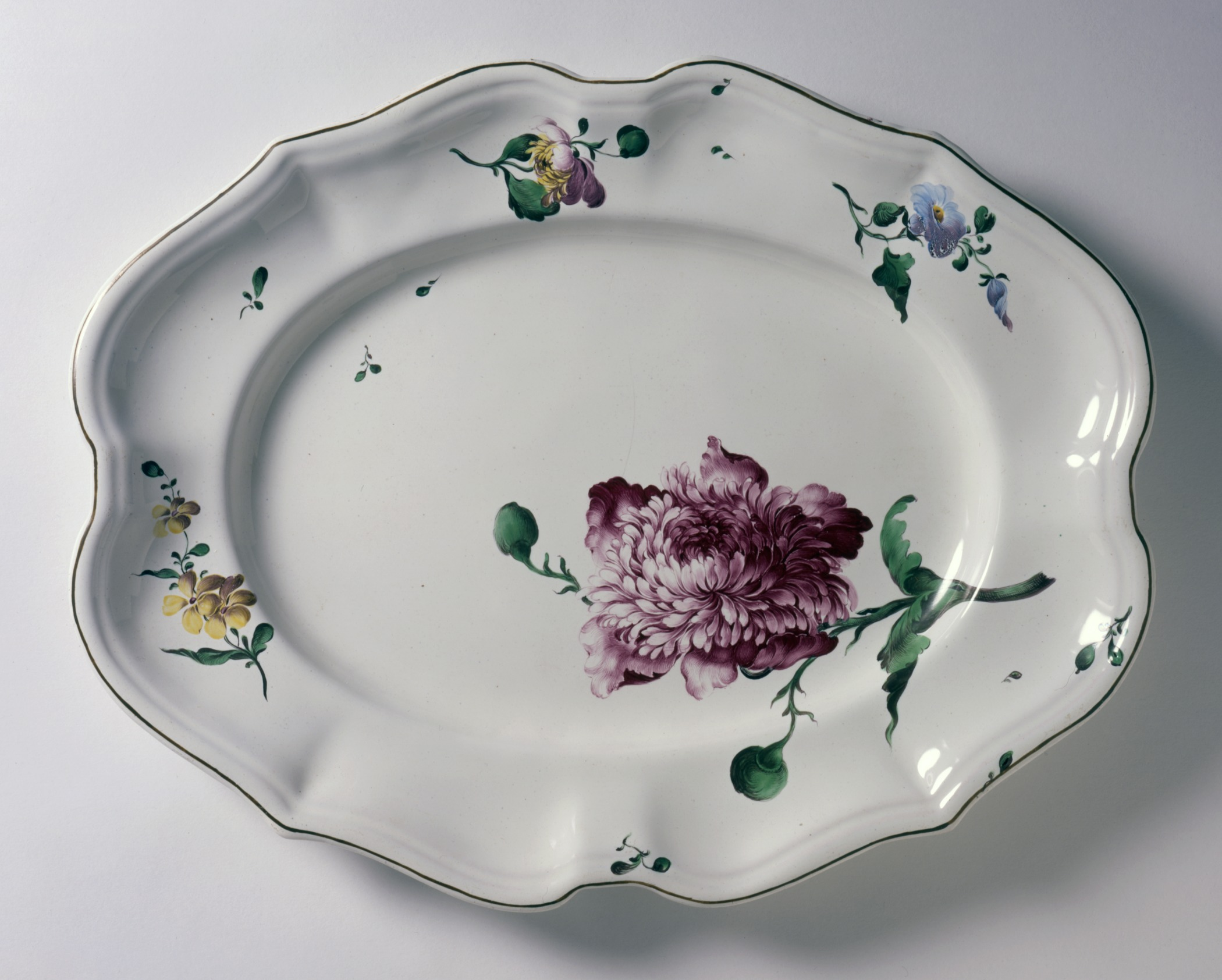
Platter with a paeony from the French Hannong factory making Strasbourg faience, c. 1765

The Frankenthal Porcelain Factory (German: Porzellanmanufaktur Frankenthal) was one of the greatest porcelain manufacturers of Germany and operated in Frankenthal in the Rhineland-Palatinate between 1755 and 1799. From the start they made hard-paste porcelain, and produced both figurines and dishware of very high quality, somewhat reflecting in style the French origin of the business, especially in their floral painting. Initially they were a private business, but from 1761 were owned by the local ruler, like most German porcelain factories of the period.

== History ==
The porcelain factory in Frankenthal was established in 1755 by the Hannong family, who had previously manufactured porcelain, as well as Strasbourg faience, in Strasbourg until Louis XVI established a state monopoly on porcelain in favour of the Sèvres factory and closed down all others. Karl Hannong transferred his business to an empty barracks in Frankenthal, just outside Mannheim, and staffed it with his Strasbourg workforce, under a privilege from the local ruler Charles Theodore, Elector Palatine, who visited the factory himself in the following year, once production was well under way. In 1757 additional craftsmen were hired from Meissen porcelain and in 1759 Hannong was able to open a shop in Strasbourg.

However, in 1760 Karl Hannong died and the business became the property of his two sons Joseph Adam Hannong and Peter Anton Hannong, who fell out over the "arcanum" (the formula of the paste). Their disagreements had a damaging effect on the business and by 1761 they had borrowed so much from the Elector that it was impossible for them to repay it. In 1762 therefore the Elector bought the factory from the Hannongs for 40,804 guilders, plus another 10,00 for the arcanum, and installed his own officials to manage it.

Frankenthal Porcelain was always hard-paste, as Hannong senior had been in partnership in Strasbourg with an ex-employee of the Meissen factory. It is said that one of his sons sold the secret to Sèvres, although they were unable to obtain the right raw materials for some time.

The years from 1762 to 1770 were extraordinarily successful: the products achieved high quality and established the factory's reputation. They retained some of the French style of Strasbourg. From 1770 all items were marked with a date mark. The earlier body was "a fine creamy white with a well-used glaze", but from 1774 the paste was made with local china clay, generally mixed with "Passau earth" (Passauer Erde), resulting in lower quality. By 1776 the Frankenthal porcelain factory had shops in Aachen, Basel, Frankfurt, Livorno, Mainz, Munich and Nancy.

The Napoleonic Wars brought an end to the business. Frankenthal was occupied by the French in 1794, who closed the porcelain factory down in 1799. Production had been lower since at least 1790, and models and moulds had been moved to Nymphenburg, which the Elector owned by then, having also become Prince-Elector of Bavaria.

The Frankenthal factory was in operation for only 44 years (run for 7 years by the Hannongs, and for 37 by the electoral administration) and is thus the shortest-lived of the major German porcelain manufacturers. It was marked by an unusually numerous succession of directors and principal modellers, although some of the main painters spent a long time at the factory; painted mythological scenes were a Frankenthal speciality.

Collections of Frankenthal porcelain may be seen, among other places, in the Reiss Engelhorn Museum in Mannheim, the Kurpfälzisches Museum in Heidelberg, the Historisches Museum der Pfalz in Speyer and the Bavarian National Museum in Munich. Works of the brothers Paul and Johann Hannong are displayed in the Musée des Arts décoratifs, Strasbourg and in the Musée du pain d'épice in Gertwiller.

== Gallery ==
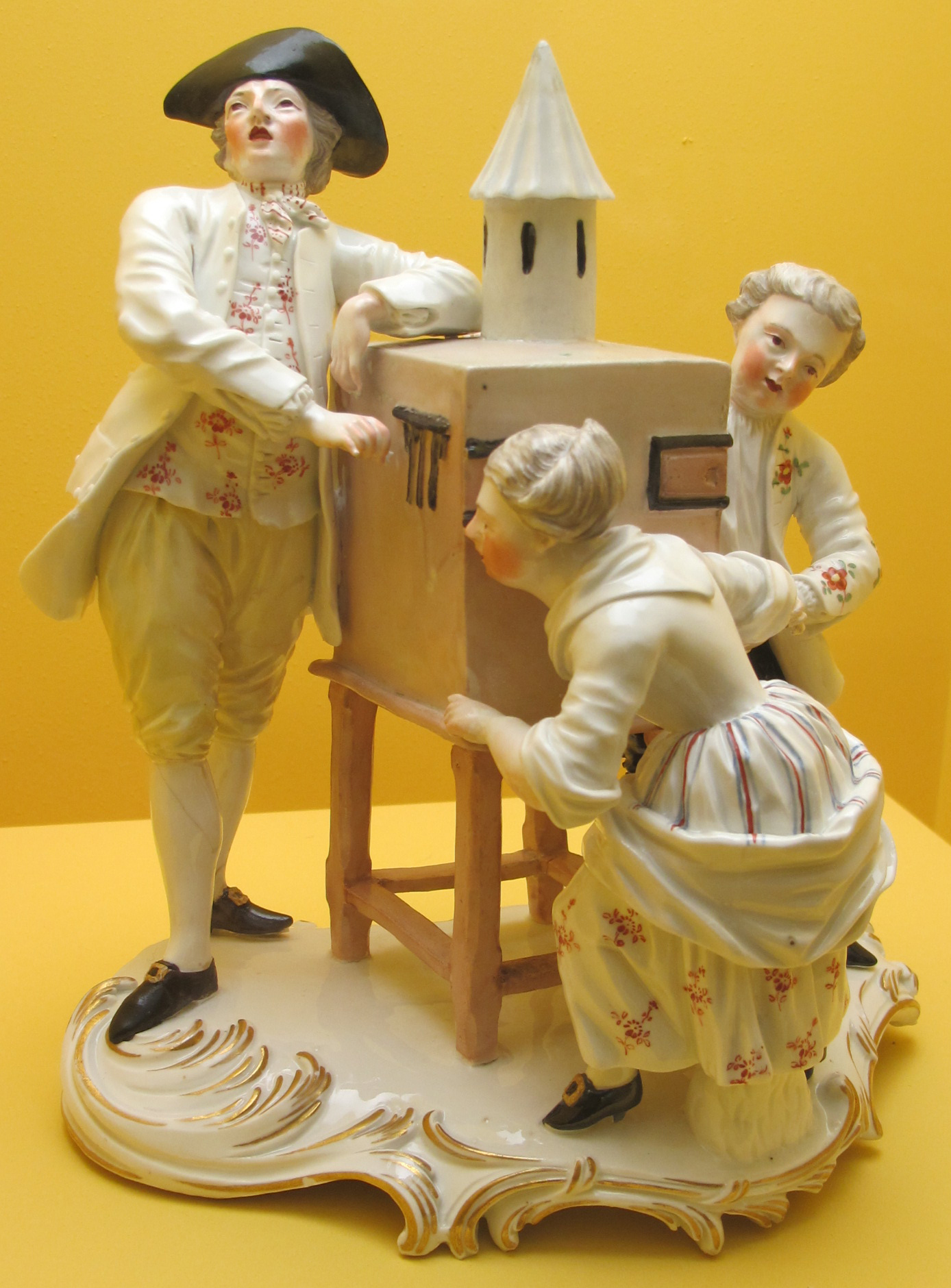
Group by Johann Friederich Lück, "The Mondo Nuovo", 1758–63.

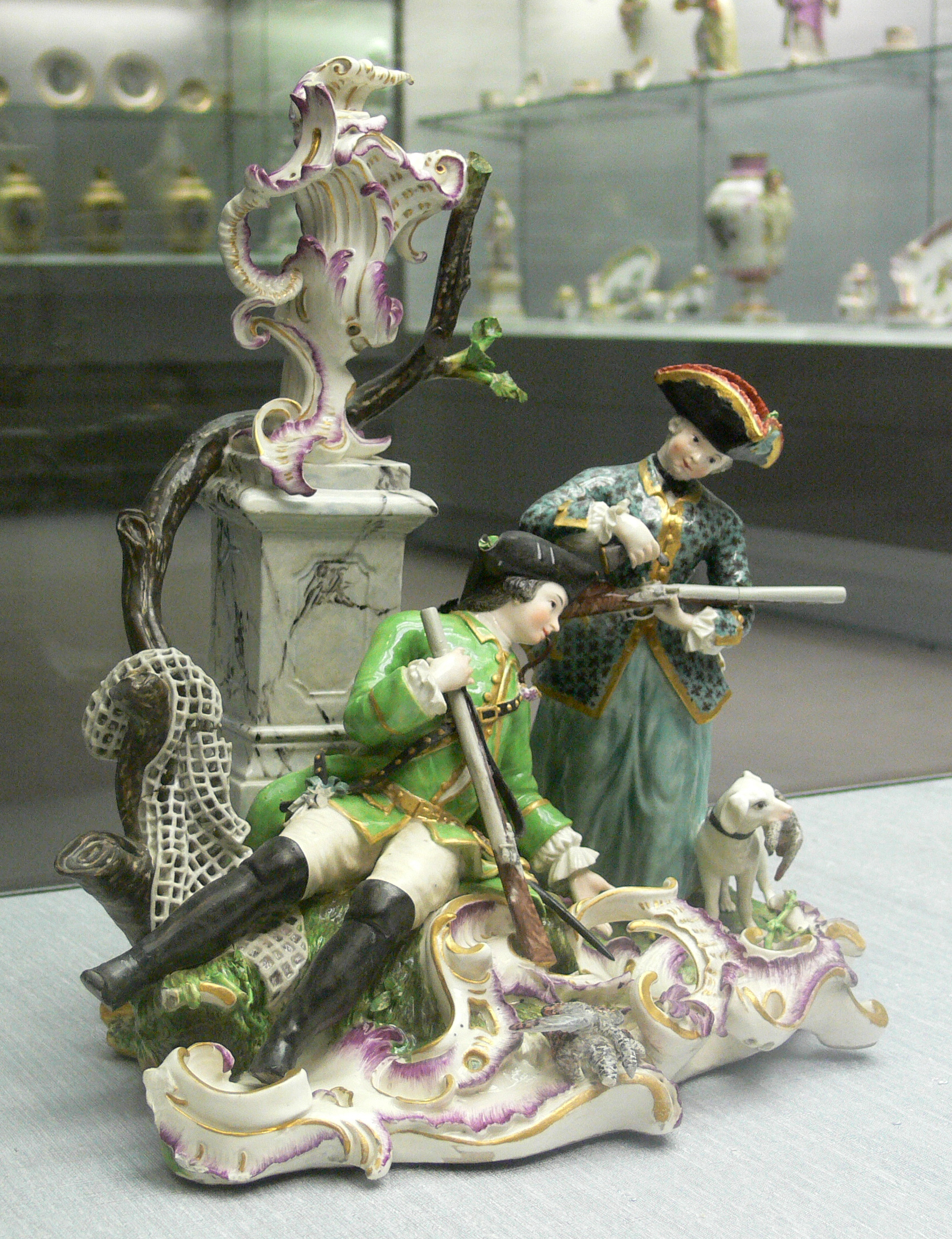
Two hunters by Lück, 1760

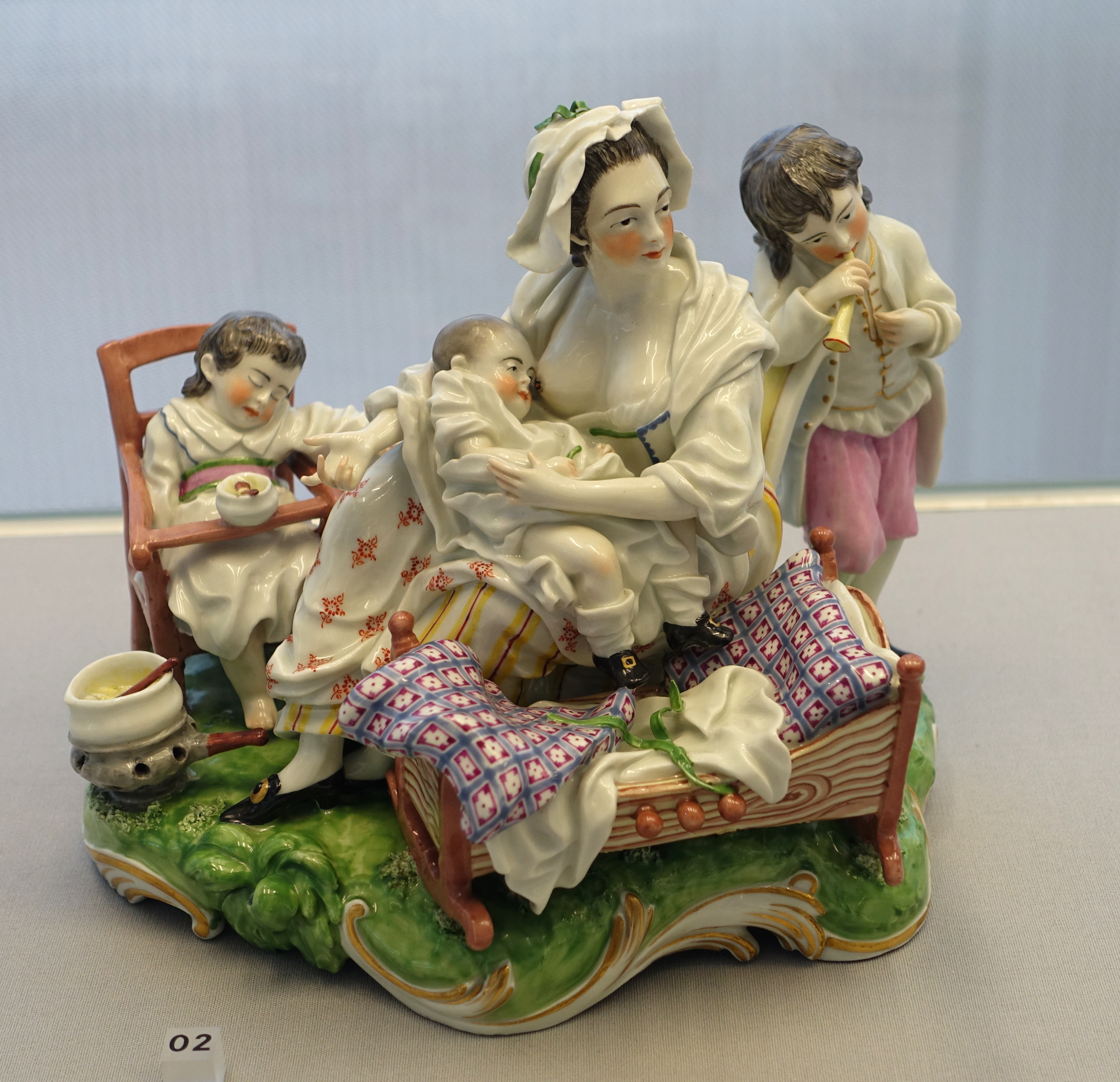
The Good Mother, by Carl Gottlieb Luck after Jean-Baptiste Greuze, c. 1765

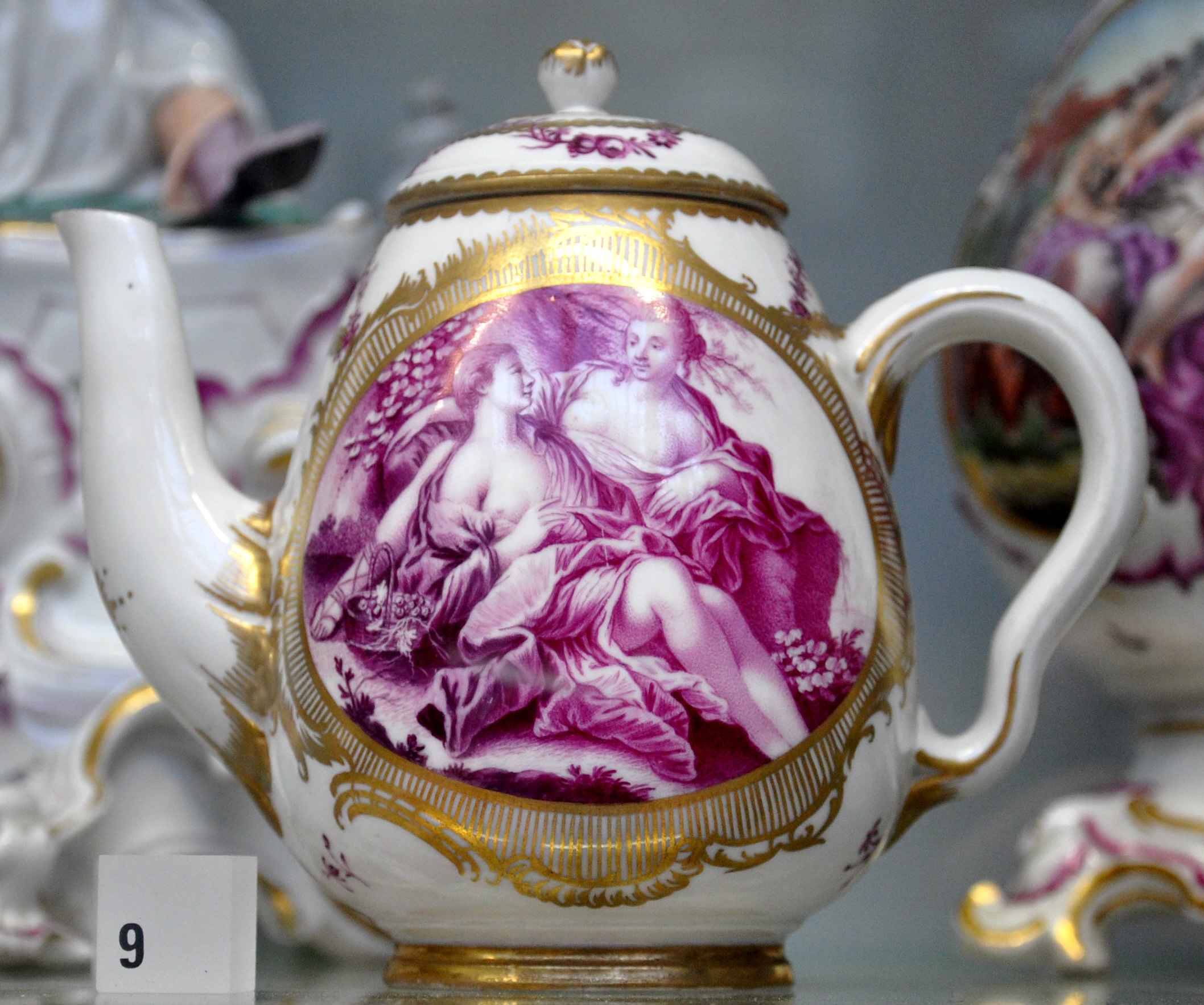
Teapot with classical figures, 1771

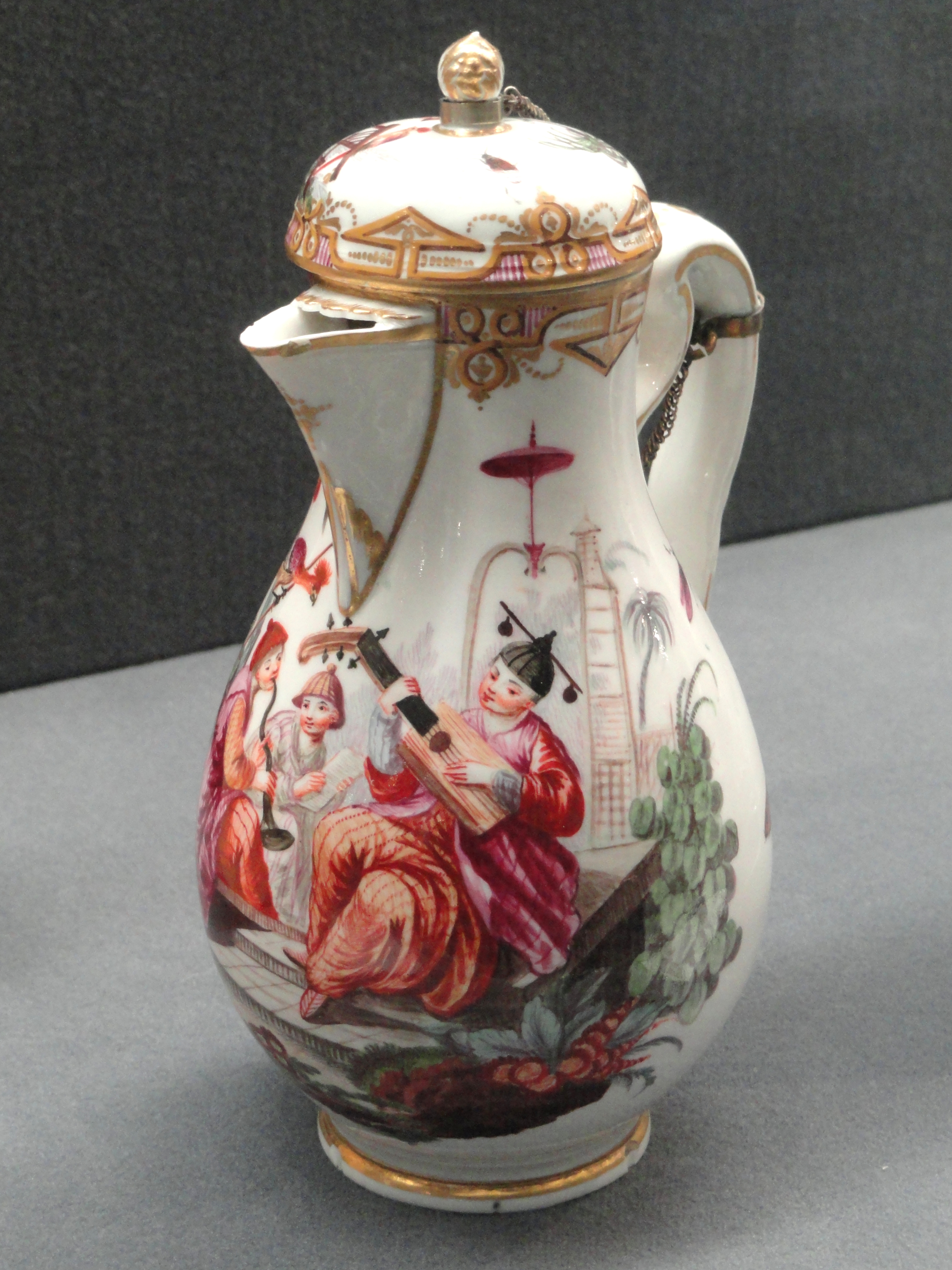
Milk jug with chinoiserie scenes, c. 1772, Frankenthal, hard-paste porcelain

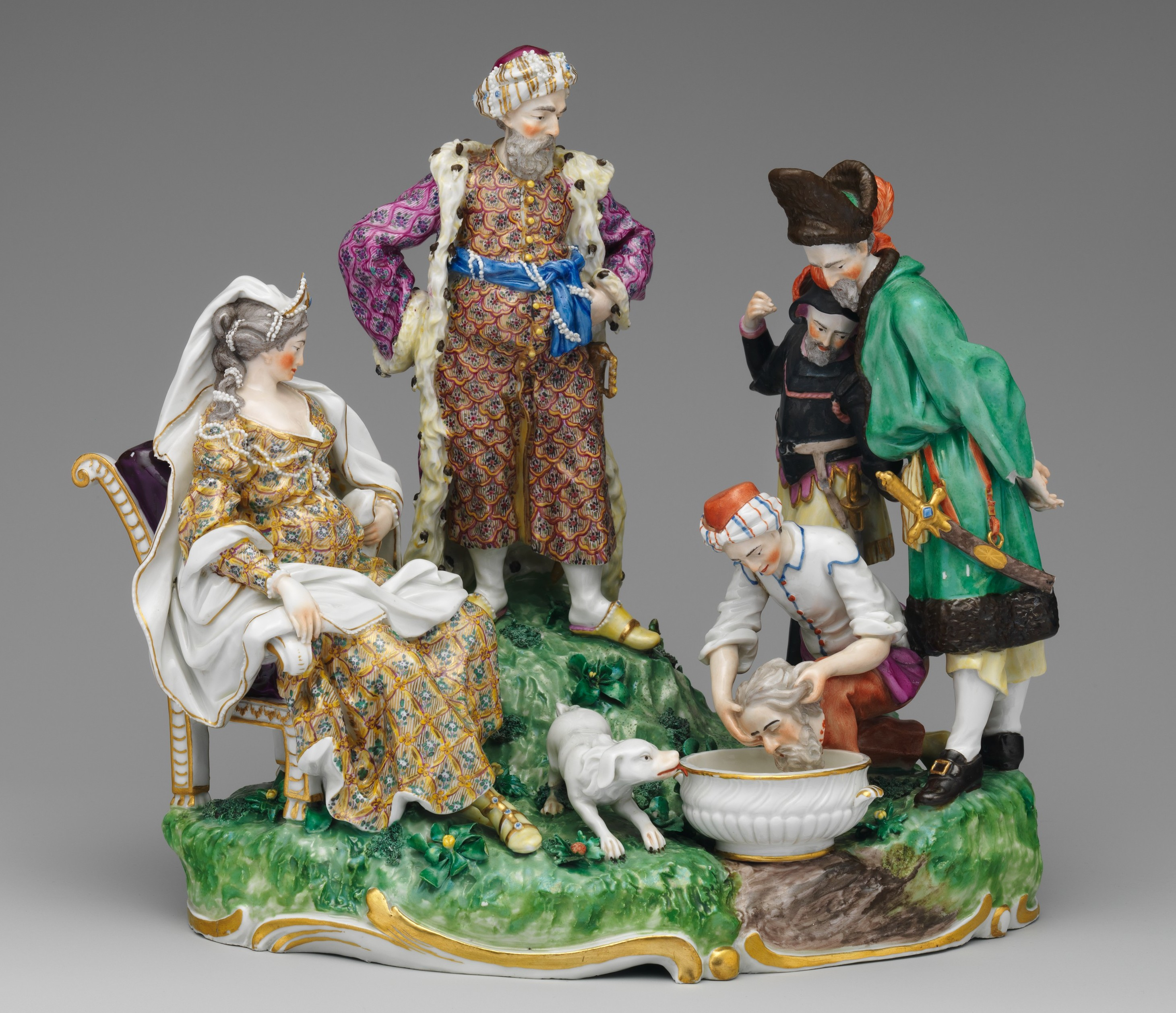
Tomyris and the Head of Cyrus, c. 1773

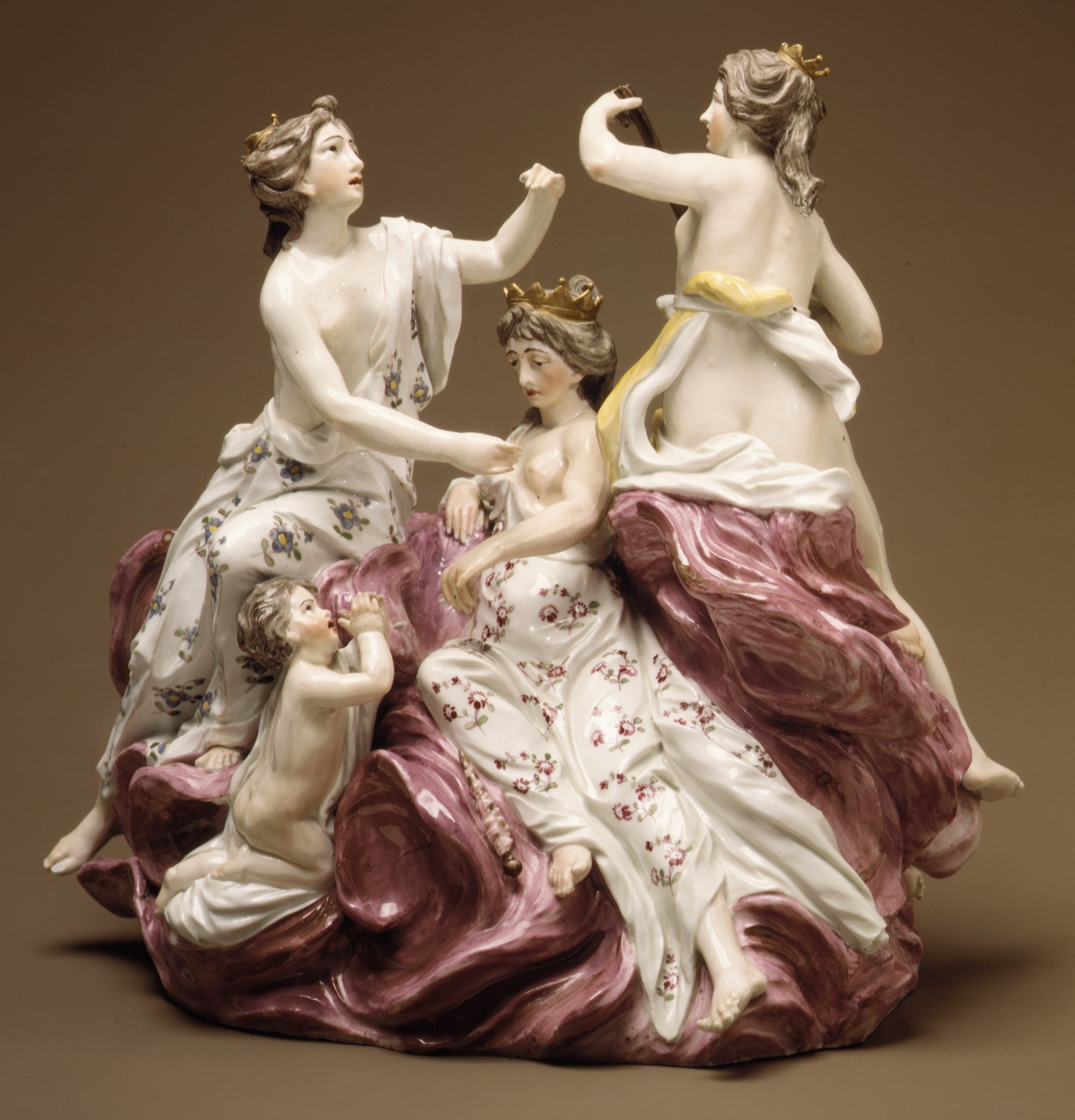
The Three Fates, 1773

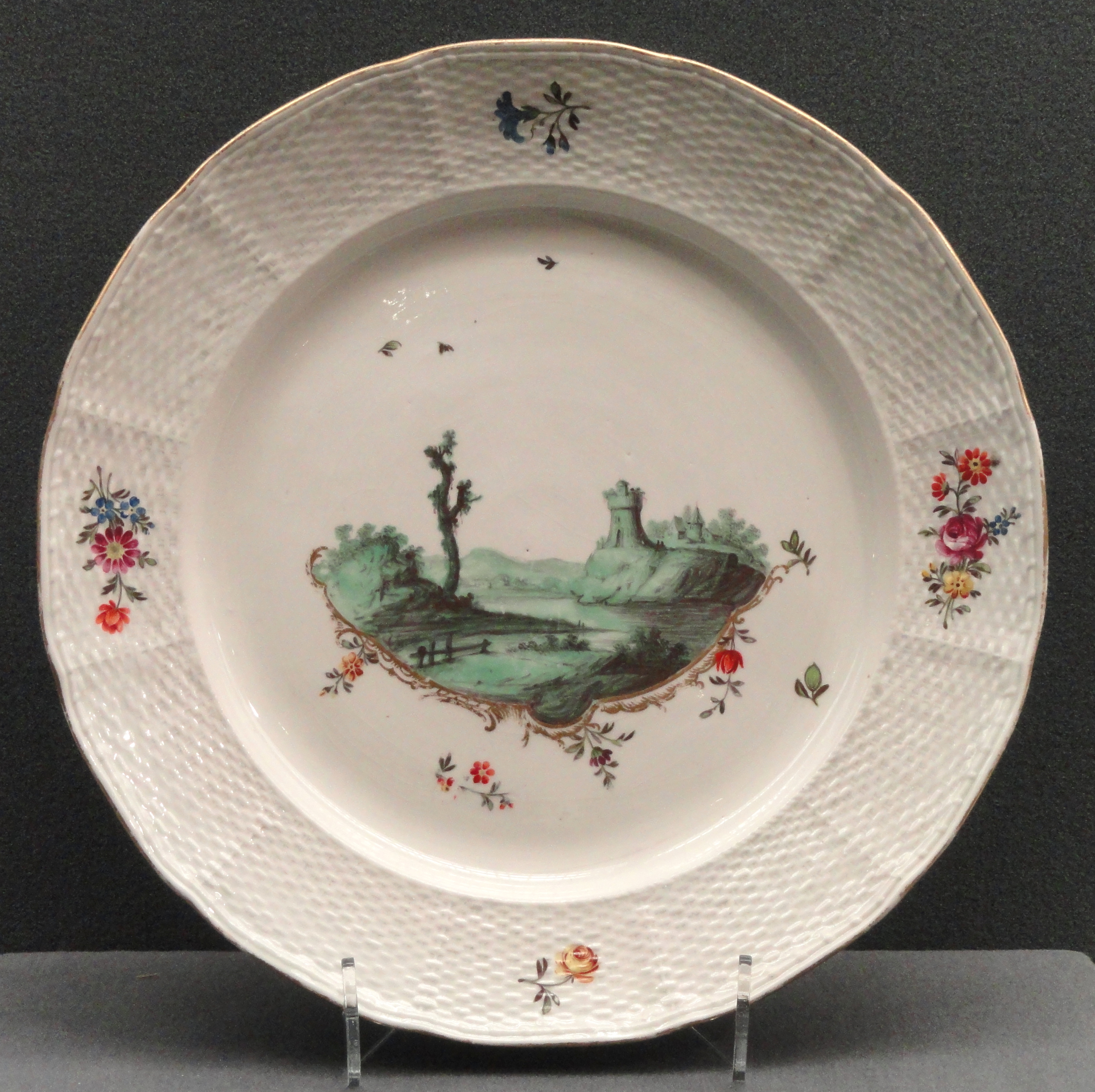
Plate with Green Landscape, c. 1778, Frankenthal, hard-paste porcelain, using Meissen's "Neuozier relief decoration on the lip.

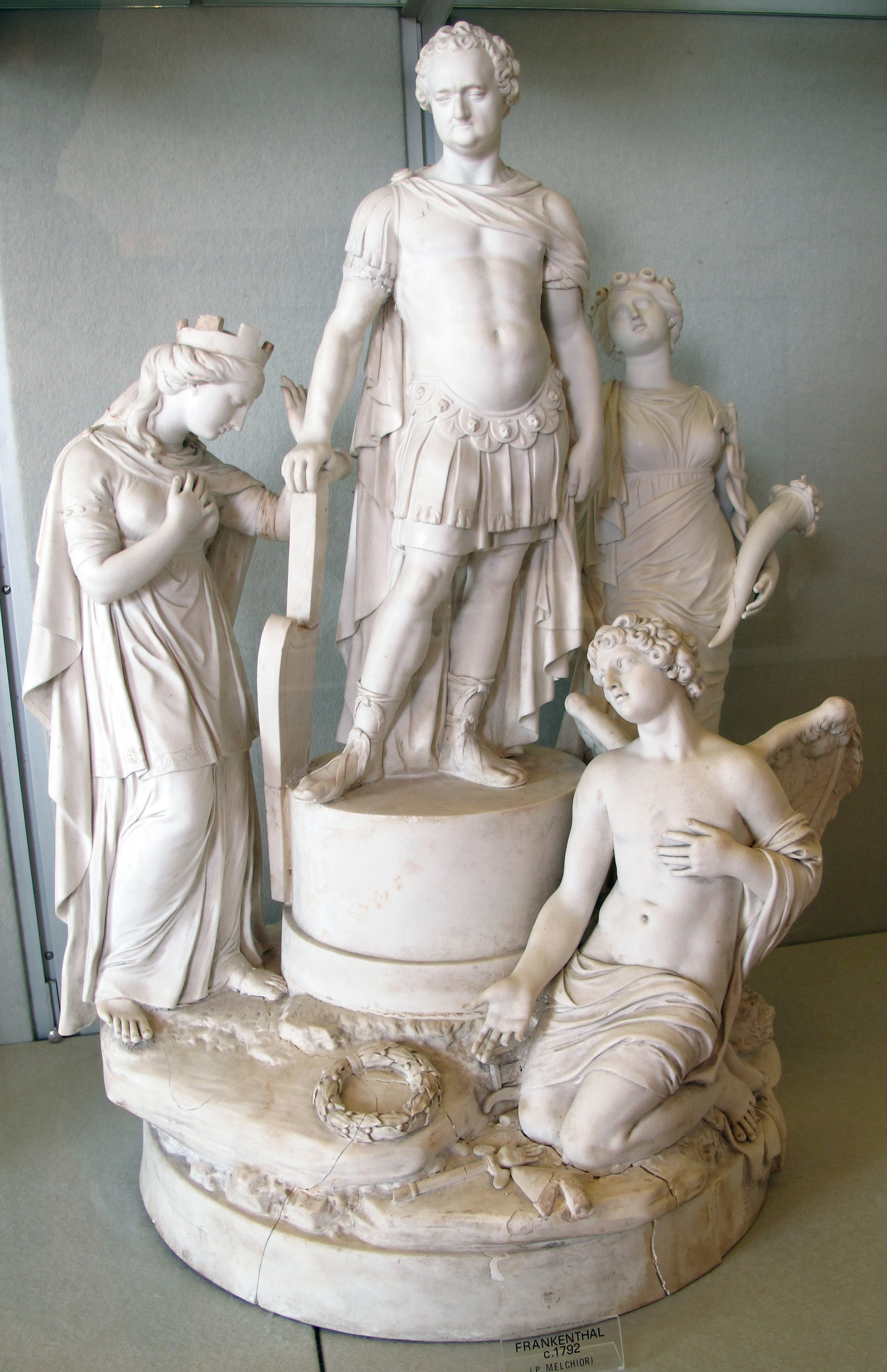
Neoclassical group of Charles Theodore, Elector of Bavaria in biscuit porcelain, c. 1792

== See also ==
- Porcelain manufacturing companies in Europe
