= Strasbourg faience =

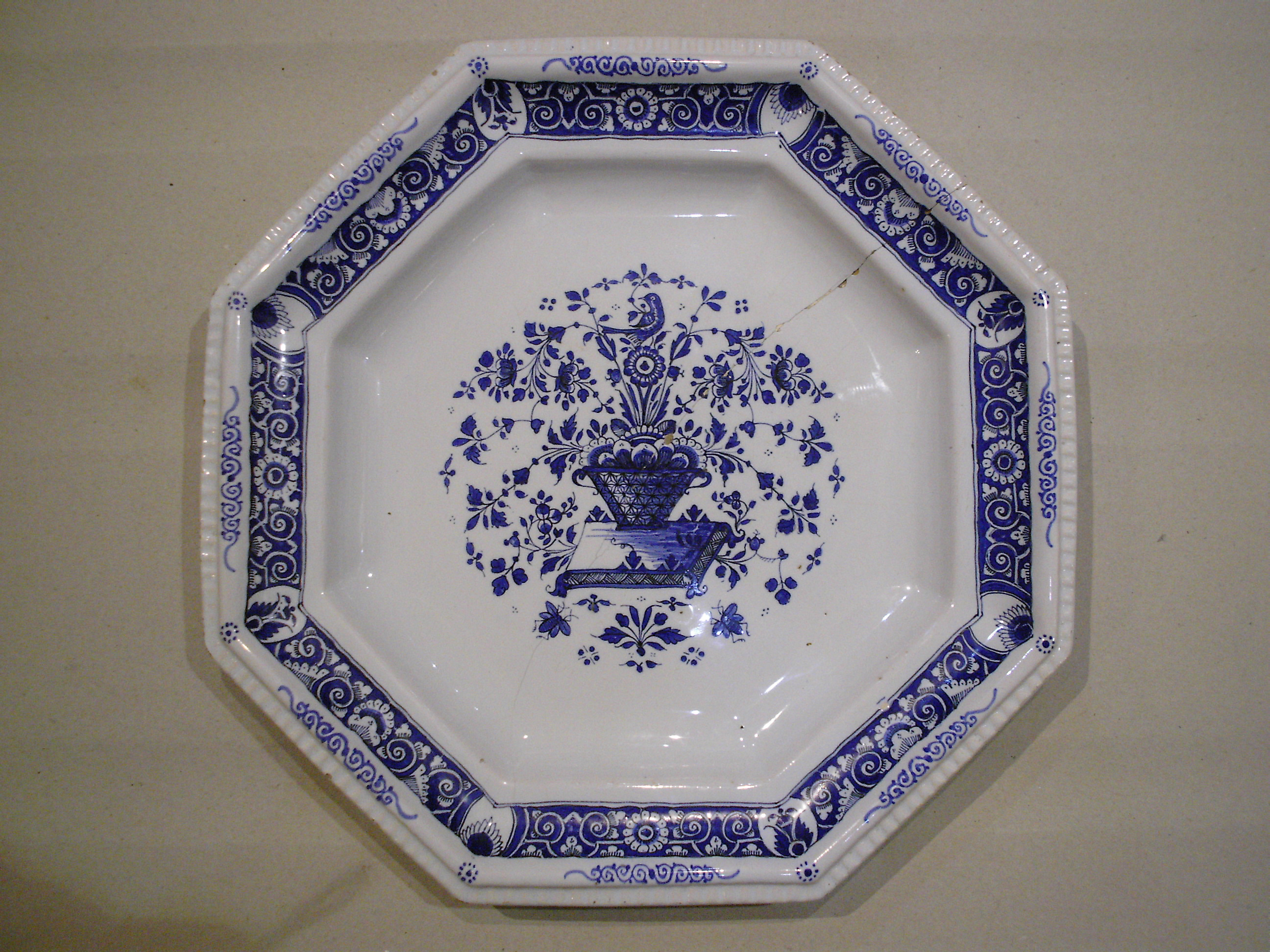
Faience by Charles-François Hannong

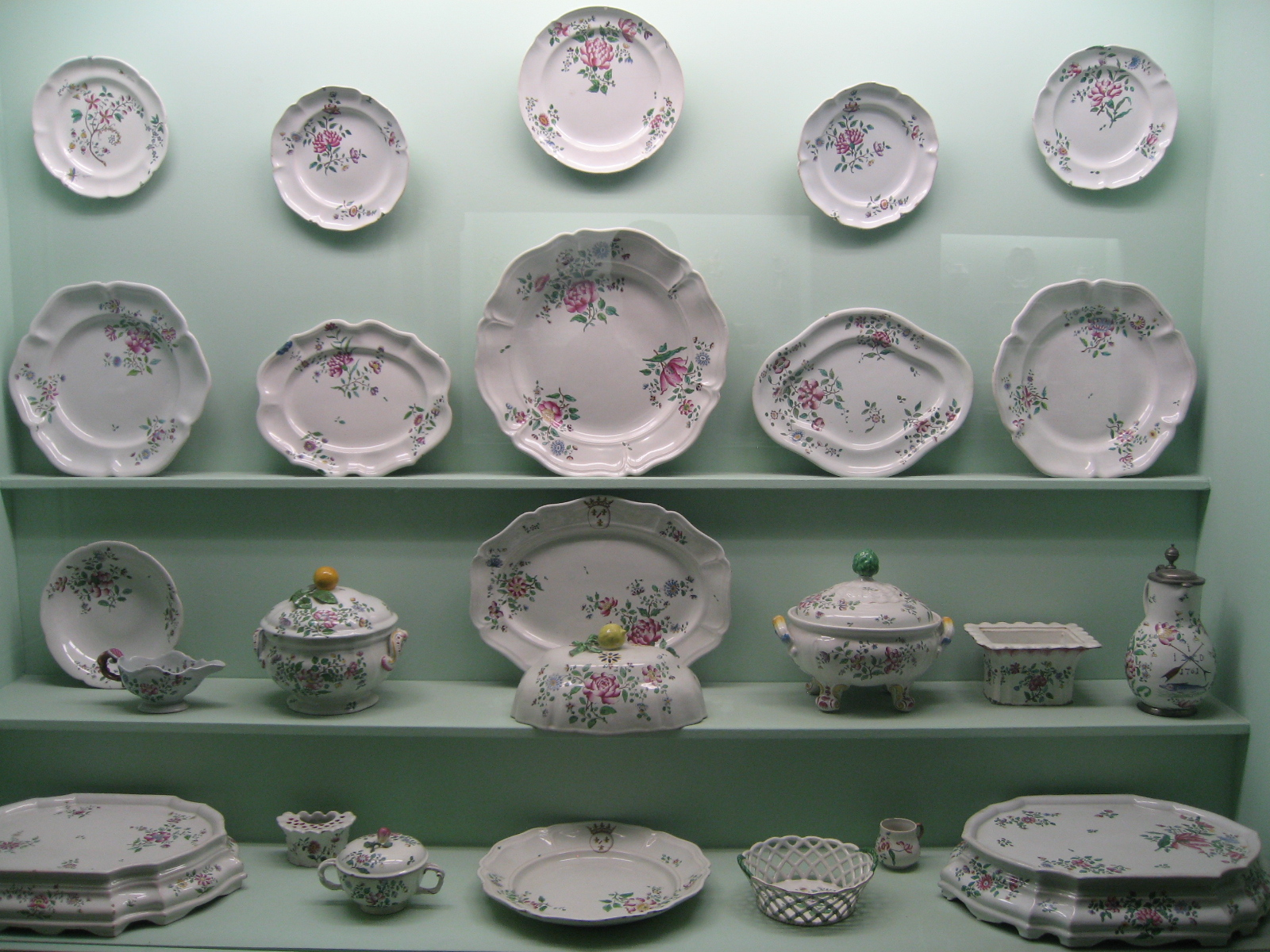
Faience by Paul Hannong

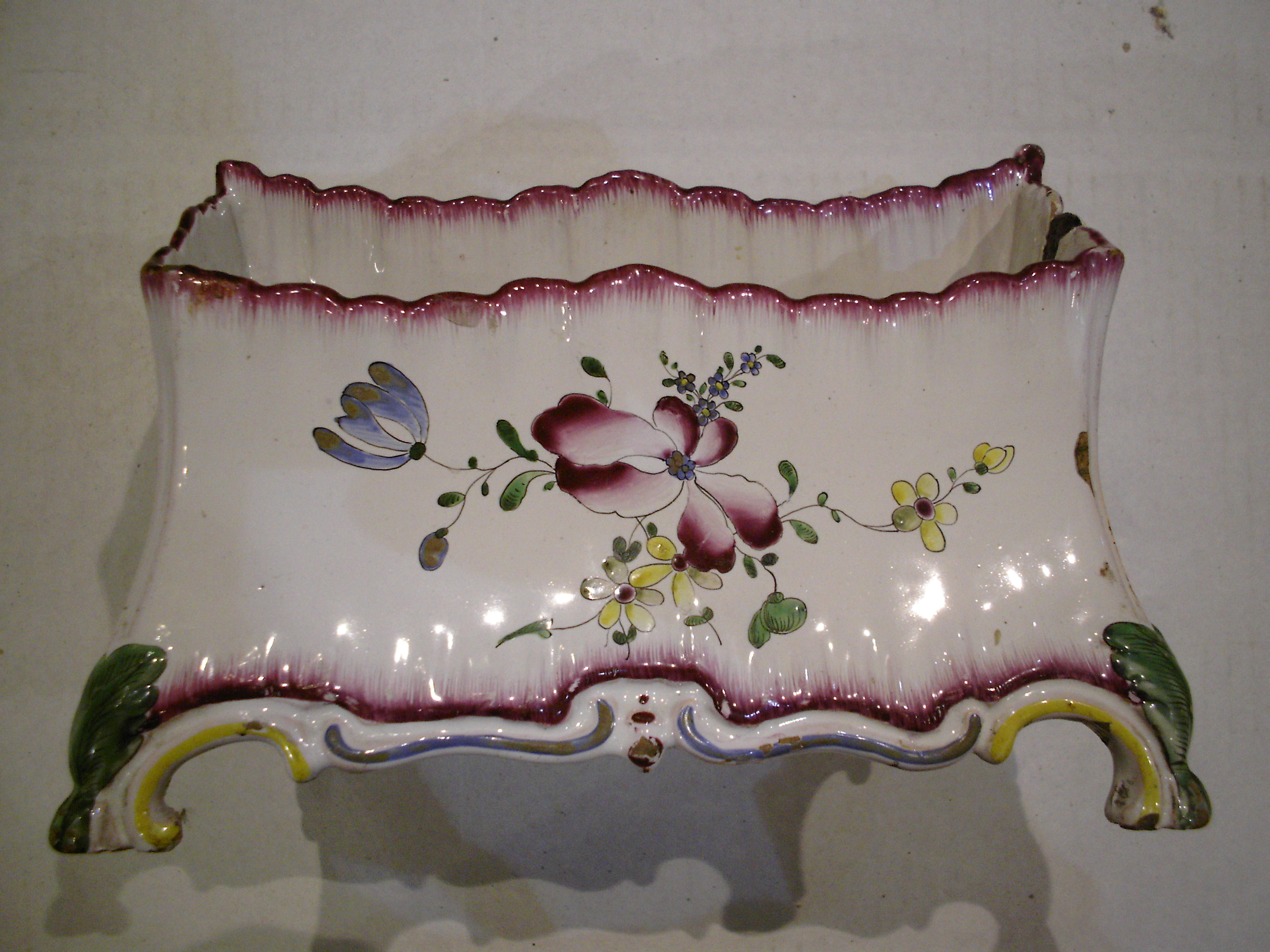
Faience by Joseph Hannong

Strasbourg faience or Strasbourg ware is a form of faience produced by the Strasbourg-Haguenau company in Strasbourg in the 18th century.

The company was founded by a Dutch ceramicist, Charles-Francois Hannong. Charles-Francois was born in Maastricht around 1669 and later married Anne Nikke, daughter of a German pipe-maker, in Cologne. In 1709 they moved to Strasbourg, where Charles-François set up a pipe-making factory. At first he concentrated on producing enamelled earthenware stoves. Around 1720 he was working with Henri Wackenfeld, perfecting these stoves and at the same time making experiments in porcelain, in which they attained a certain success, with great improvements being achieved by succeeding members of the Hannong family. Wackenfeld later left Strasbourg and Charles-Francois continued alone. By 1724, the faience was so successful that Charles-Francois opened a second factory in Haguenau. Eight years later he retired, leaving the family business to his sons, Paul-Antoine and Balthasar, who paid him an annual pension until his death in 1739.

The decoration improved in 1744, when Paul perfected the method of applying gilding. Ten years later his success prompted him to apply for a licence to manufacture this porcelain. However, the director of the royal factory, the Manufacture nationale de Sèvres declined to issue a license, forcing him to close his works, which he transferred to Frankenthal in 1755, setting up the Frankenthal Porcelain Factory. When the French prohibition was relaxed in 1766, Paul's son Joseph resumed making porcelain at Strasbourg. He did not prosper, however, and in 1780 he fled to Germany because of debt. Production at the Strasbourg factory ceased, and the company went into bankruptcy.

Over six decades, three generations of Hannongs had created innovative styles and techniques, raising earthenware to new levels of sophistication and finesse. The Hannongs were early practitioners of overglaze decoration in France, referred to as 'petit-feu' (small fire) in French. This involved a second firing at a lower temperature, making it possible to have a wider range of colours, including radiant reds, colours that had not been able to survive the traditional grand-feu firing temperature. Using this broad colour range, the Hannongs designed motifs of naturalistic flowers, often asymmetrically painted on plates and tureens. Strasbourg faience products include large tureens designed by Paul, in forms such as pumpkins and cabbages, as well as naturalistic figures of animals. His work ranged from ornate Rococo pieces, such as clock cases, to plates with unsophisticated floral decoration.

The Strasbourg technique spawned a number of imitations including the ware of Marseille, Niderviller, Luneville, St. Clement, Sceaux, Aprey, Lodi in northern Italy and the majority of the smaller factories in France.

A large collection of this faience is on display in the Musée des Arts décoratifs, Strasbourg. Haguenau's Musée historique and Gertwiller's Musée du pain d'épices also display valuable Hannong faience, as does the Castle "Favorite" on the other side of the Rhine.
