= Musée des Arts décoratifs, Strasbourg =

Museum in Strasbourg, France

Musée des Arts décoratifs
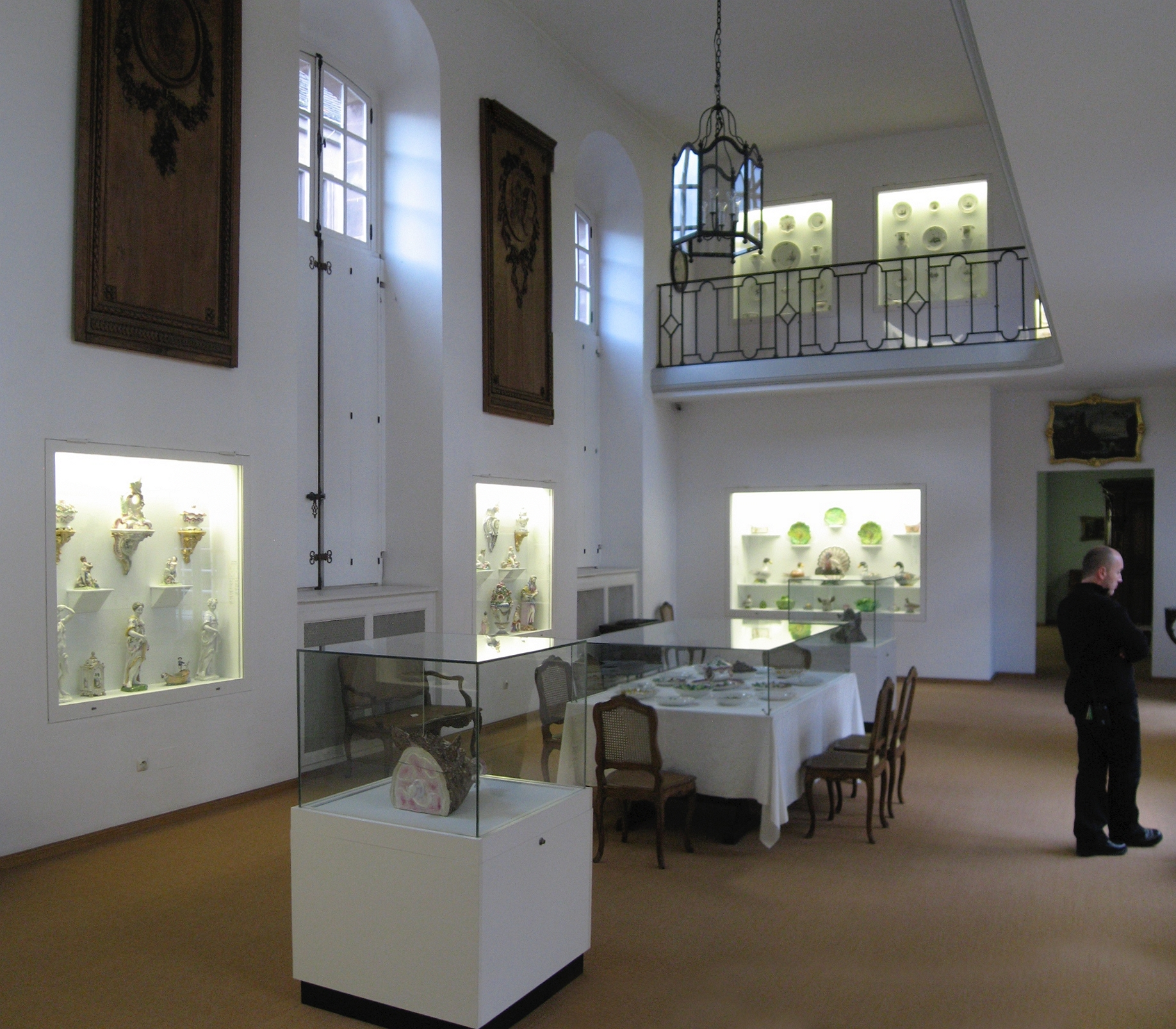
- An exhibition room in the museum in the Palais Rohan

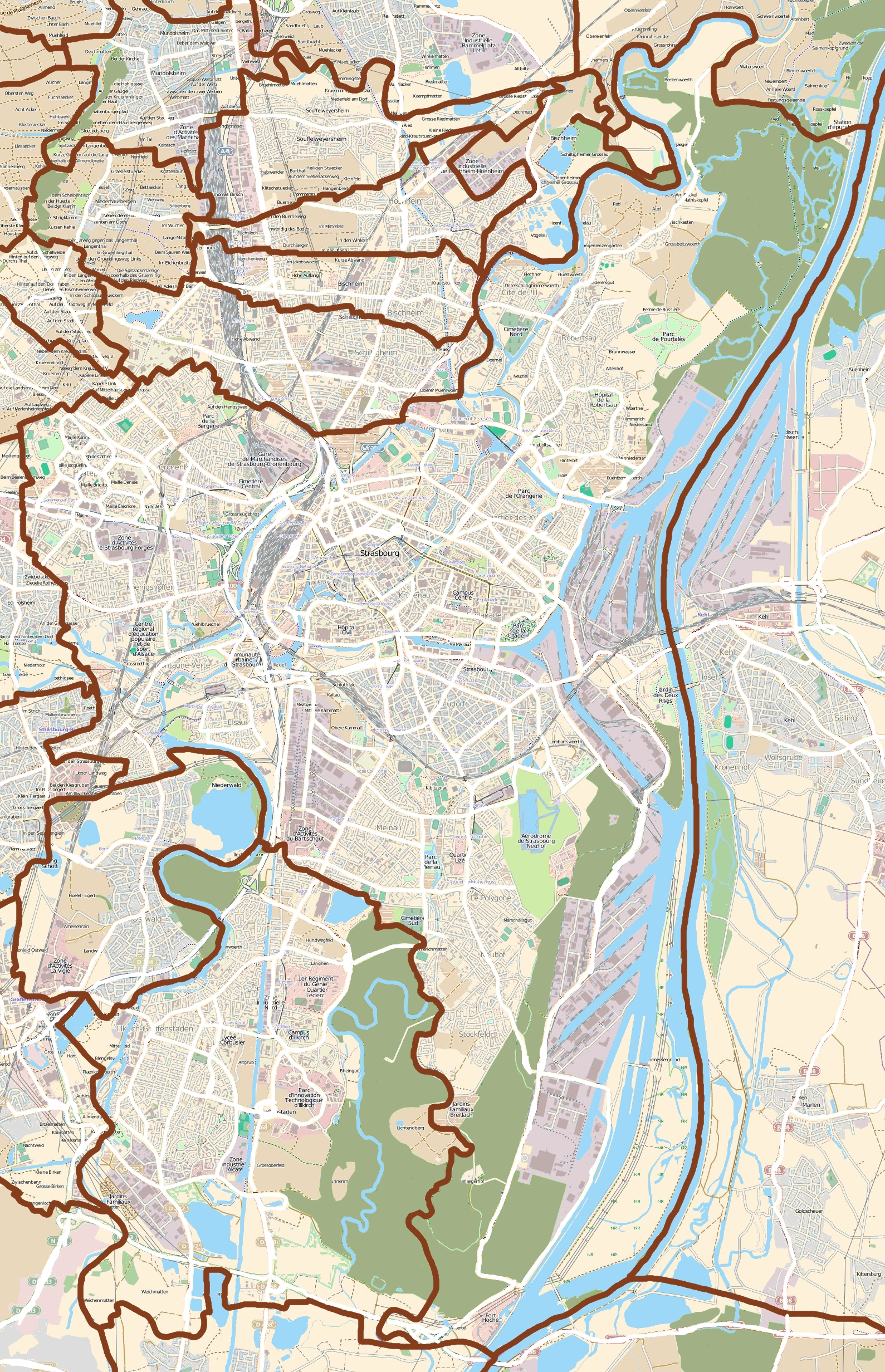
- Location within Strasbourg
- Coordinates: 48.581111°N 7.752222°E
- Website: en.musees.strasbourg.eu/museum-of-decorative-arts

The Musée des Arts décoratifs (Museum of Decorative Art) of the city of Strasbourg, France, is found on the ground floor of the Palais Rohan, the former city palace of the Prince-Bishops from the Rohan family. One half of the museum is made up of the magnificent chambers in the late baroque, Rococo and Empire styles. The other half offers a broad overview of the art of Alsatian porcelain, gold- and silversmith masters between 1681 and 1870 (decorative arts from the region prior to the French conquest are displayed in the nearby Musée de l’Œuvre Notre-Dame.)

== The collection ==
After severe damage to the palace by English and American bombing on 11 August 1944, the chambers of the Prince-Bishops were restored little by little to their original condition up until the 1990s and the interior furnishings were rebuilt.

== Collections ==
The chambers have the traditional furnishings of courtly display rooms (Gobelins tapestries, chinoiserie, wood carvings, murals, stucco decorations, trompe-l'œil, etc.), all displaying a high degree of craftsmanship as well as artistry.

The emphasis of the remainder of the collection is the sometimes remarkably exuberant porcelain creations of the Strasbourg factory of the brothers Paul and Johann Hannong, the founders and directors of the widely famous Frankenthal Porcelain Factory. It also displays the vermeil work of the Strasbourg master families of Imlin and Kirstein.

The museum displays elements of the first astronomical clock of Strasbourg Cathedral, among which the cock is said to be the world's oldest automaton.

== Literature ==
- Étienne Martin et al.: Decorative Arts Museum. Palais Rohan, Éditions des musées de Strasbourg, Strasbourg, 2021, ISBN 9782351251799
