= Möllendorff Dinner Service =

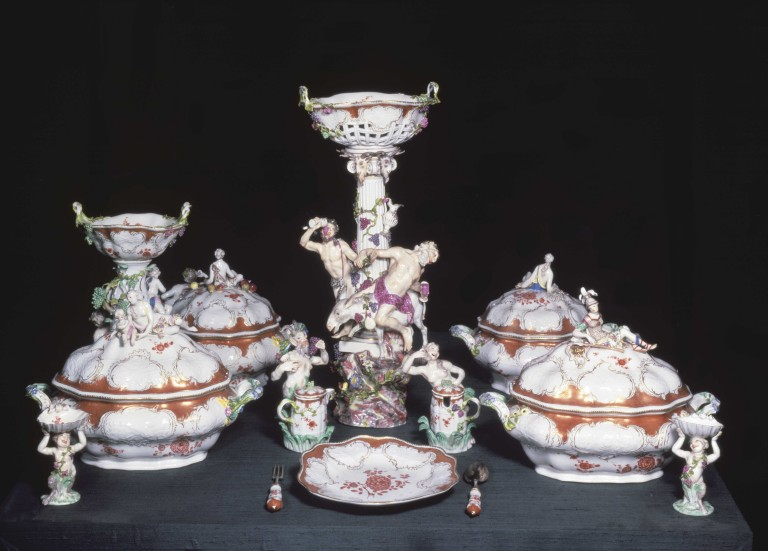
Part of the Möllendorff Dinner Service, about 1762 designed by Frederick II the Great, King of Prussia (1712-1786) V&A Museum no. C.238-1921

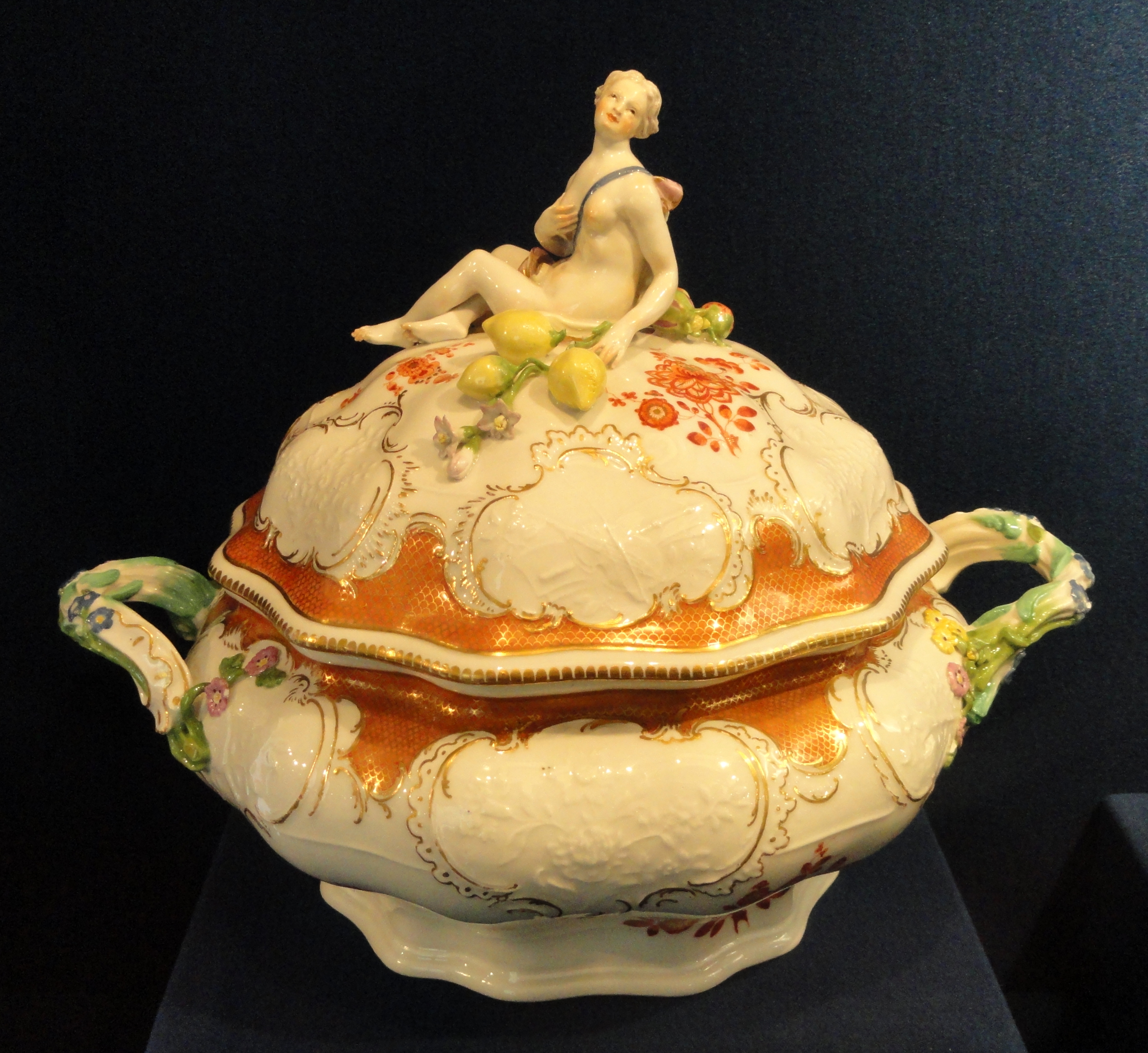
:Soup tureen from the Mollendorff service, c. 1751

The Möllendorff Dinner Service of Meissen porcelain was designed in about 1762 by Frederick II the Great, King of Prussia (1712–86), in collaboration with Karl Jacob Christian Klipfel, a Meissen artist and musician. Some of the figures were modelled by Johann Joachim Kändler (1706–75). The factory's renown was in great part due to the ingenuity of Kändler, a court sculptor who became chief modeller for Meissen and worked there for 42 years. The service, which originally consisted of over 960 pieces, was presented to the Prussian Major-General (later Field-Marshal) Wichard Joachim Heinrich von Möllendorf (1724–1816), as a reward for his military achievements during the Seven Years' War (1756–63) against Austria for possession of Silesia.

Divided up in the 19th century, groups of the Möllendorff Dinner Service are now held in both public and private collections worldwide, including the Victoria and Albert Museum.

== Meissen porcelain ==
Meissen was the first European factory to make porcelain successfully in 1710. Although the secret of porcelain production soon spread to other European centres, the supremacy of Meissen's ceramics remained unchallenged for many decades. In the 1720s the Meissen factory began to produce richly decorated table services, which soon came to replace silver as grand diplomatic gifts.

== Bibliography ==
- Jackson, Anna, ed. (2001), V&A: A Hundred Highlights, Victoria and Albert Museum, ISBN 978-1-85177-365-7
