= Briot =

Briot may refer to:

== People ==
- Charles Auguste Briot (1817–1882), French mathematician
- Isaac Briot (1585–1670), French engraver and draughtsman
- François Briot (1550-1616), French medallist and engraver
- Maryvonne Briot (born 1959), French politician
- Nicholas Briot (1579–1646), French coin engraver, medallist and mechanical engineer

== Places ==
- Briot, Oise, France
