= Charles Frederick Kandler =

German-born silversmith in London (died 1778)

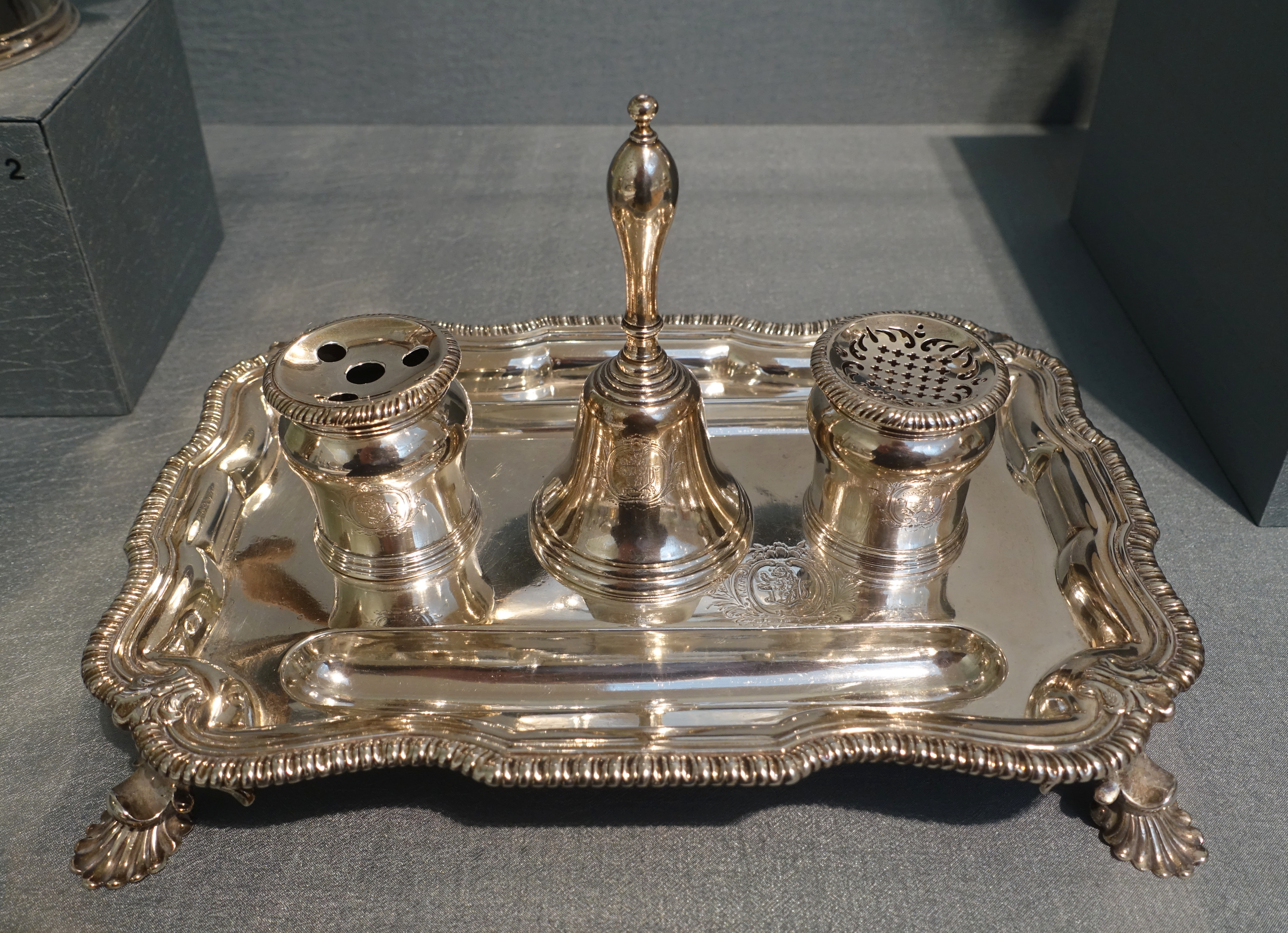
- Silver inkstand bearing Kandler's mark, London, 1753–1754, Portland Art Museum
- Born: Possibly baptised 20 April 1712; Possibly Fischbach, Electorate of Saxony
- Died: 15 October 1778; Jermyn Street, London
- Resting place: Isleworth, Middlesex
- Other names: Frederick Kandler; possibly Carl Friedrich Kändler
- Occupations: Silversmith and goldsmith
- Years active: 1735–1778
- Spouses: Mary (died 1745); Elizabeth Chamberlaine (married 1749)
- Children: Charles Kandler (1737–1807) and three daughters
- Relatives: Johann Joachim Kändler (probable brother)

Charles Frederick Kandler (died 15 October 1778), also known as Frederick Kandler, was a German-born silversmith and goldsmith who worked in London from the 1730s until his death. He has been tentatively identified with Carl Friedrich Kändler, baptised on 20 April 1712 in Saxony. In September 1735 he took over the workshop of Charles Kandler, a London silversmith of the same family who had been active since 1727 and whose mark appears on the Jerningham wine cooler. He ran the business in Jermyn Street for more than forty years.

== Names and maker's marks ==
The silver historian Peter Cameron has identified the two silversmiths as probably the brothers Carl Rudolph and Carl Friedrich Kändler, sons of a Lutheran pastor at Fischbach in Saxony and brothers of the Meissen porcelain modeller Johann Joachim Kändler. Because Arthur Grimwade earlier treated Charles and Charles Frederick Kandler as one man, museum and sale catalogues have often combined their work under a single name. Works attributed to Frederick Kandler include a pair of Hercules and Iole candelabra in the Victoria and Albert Museum, the silver hilt of a sword associated with Charles Edward Stuart, and silver cases for a pair of Torah scrolls made for Hayyim Samuel Jacob Falk.

The registered maker's marks reflect the different names. Some earlier marks were registered again, or "restruck", by Charles Frederick Kandler. Charles Kandler's first marks, entered on 29 August 1727 in partnership with James Murray, were followed after Murray's death by marks of his own: KA beneath a mitre for the Britannia standard, probably CK with a pellet or mullet below for sterling, and an unregistered CK beneath a mitre, which appears on an undated kettle in the Victoria and Albert Museum. On 10 September 1735, Charles Frederick Kandler restruck the KA mark with the mitre and added the first mark with the initials FK. A further FK mark was entered on 25 June 1739, followed by an undated variant below it. A Britannia-standard mark was found in 1964 on an inkstand made in 1751. The FK initials appear beneath a crown on the candelabra of 1738–1739 and beneath a mitre on the sword hilt of 1740–41. Grimwade interpreted the restruck mitre mark and the similar handwriting in the entries as proof of a single maker. Cameron read the mark as a family mark re-entered by a successor. He explained the mitre by the workshop's trade sign: the business was "at the sign of the mitre", first in St Martin's Lane and then in Jermyn Street, at least until 1735. Frederick's son Charles Kandler entered his own CK mark on 12 November 1778.

== Family and origins ==
Cameron's proposed identification links Kandler to Carl Friedrich Kändler, who was baptised on 20 April 1712 at Fischbach in Saxony. The child's father, Johann Joachim Kändler (1655–1736), was the Lutheran pastor of Fischbach and had thirteen children. The parish registers record the baptisms of nine sons of the pastor and his wife Johanna Salome. The eldest, Carl Rudolph, was baptised in 1695. Johann Joachim, baptised in 1706, became the chief modeller of the Meissen porcelain factory. Christian Heinrich and Carl Adolph also worked in porcelain. In 1710 Carl Rudolph was apprenticed to the Dresden court goldsmith Johann Jacob Irminger.

A silversmith calling himself Charles Kandler entered his first marks at Goldsmiths' Hall in London on 29 August 1727, in partnership with a James Murray and with an address in St Martin's Lane. Murray died within a few months, and Kandler then registered marks of his own. A mitre appears in three of the Kandler marks. A note found in 1979 inside a gilt-metal tabernacle made for the Duke of Norfolk states that it was made in 1730 by "Chas Kandler Goldsmith att the miter In St Martins Lane". By 1732 Kandler had moved to the north side of Great Jermyn Street, beside St James's Church. His mark appears on the Jerningham wine cooler, a huge silver cistern hallmarked for 1734 and made for the goldsmith-banker Henry Jernegan. The last record of Charles Kandler in England is a tax entry of 12 July 1735. No burial or will has been found, and Cameron suggests that he went abroad, perhaps back to Germany. The records of the Meissen manufactory note a visit on 3 September 1735 by a goldsmith named Kendler from Dresden, and Maureen Cassidy-Geiger suggests that this may have been Charles Kandler on his return.

=== Identification ===
N. M. Penzer, writing in 1956, assumed that Charles Frederick Kandler was a nephew or cousin of Charles. Arthur Grimwade, in his 1976 dictionary of London goldsmiths, treated the two names as one man and called the identity of "this highly important maker" a "baffling mystery". He thought that the German name and the "highly plastic quality" of the work pointed to some connection with the Meissen modeller. He argued that the undated mitre mark entered for Kandler alone was restruck in the entry of 10 September 1735, and that the signatures of 1727, 1735 and 1739 were "clearly in the same hand". Cameron notes that this view was generally accepted by writers and cataloguers, but he finds the handwriting argument weak: a close relative might write a similar hand, and a family member taking over a business might re-enter its mark. In 1996 he argued from the mark registers, parish rate books, fire insurance policies, apprenticeship tax records and the tabernacle note that all the evidence before September 1735 refers to Charles Kandler and all the later evidence to Charles Frederick, who took over the business.

Philippa Glanville had suggested, after Rainer Rückert found the record of Carl Rudolph Kändler's apprenticeship, that Carl Rudolph came to England and later adopted the name Frederick. Cameron considers it more plausible that Carl Rudolph worked in London as Charles Kandler and that his younger brother Carl Friedrich, trained in his workshop, took it over in 1735 as Charles Frederick. He calls this a tentative thesis. Kändler was not a rare surname in Saxony, and the London Kandlers were Roman Catholics, so two sons of a Lutheran pastor would have had to change their faith. Cameron thinks such a conversion more likely to have happened in Dresden, under its Catholic electors, than in England. The Victoria and Albert Museum now describes Charles Frederick Kandler as having succeeded his brother, and as thought to come from the Kändler family of Meissen. The 2008 revision of Grove Art Online also distinguishes Charles from Frederick, but suggests that Frederick may have been Charles's cousin or nephew. Other catalogues still treat the two as a single maker. (Note: The Metropolitan Museum of Art, for example, attributes its electrotype copy of the Jerningham wine cooler to "Charles Frederich Kandler", described as active from 1735 and died in 1778.)

== Career ==
On 14 June 1735 Charles Kandler took on two apprentices, Ralph Wilberforce and James Rigby. On 10 September 1735 new sterling and Britannia standard maker's marks were entered at Goldsmiths' Hall. The touch warden, Benjamin Pyne, wrote the name as "Charles Frederick Kandler in German Street near St. James Church", German Street being a form of Jermyn Street, and Kandler signed in full. In April 1736 he insured the premises in his own name, and he probably kept the two apprentices for the rest of their term. The apprenticeship tax records name Charles Frederick Kandler as master of William Moody in 1743, and Frederick Kandler as master of William Reynolds in 1748 and of Peter Rooney in 1760. Cameron suggests that he preferred the name Frederick Kandler but kept the name Charles to imply continuity of the family business. He entered further marks on 25 June 1739. In 1741 he moved from the north to the south side of Jermyn Street. From then on the rate books call him Frederick Kandler, though his insurance policies kept the name Charles until at least 1760. A parliamentary report of 1773 lists "Frederick Kandler, plateworker, Jermyn Street".

Kandler supplied largely the same Roman Catholic and Tory clientele as his predecessor. The 9th Duke and Duchess of Norfolk were still regular customers when they died in the 1770s. The Earl of Shrewsbury, the 6th Viscount Montagu, the 1st Earl of Powis, the Jacobite Tory member of parliament Wrightson Mundy and the Earl of Strafford all bought Kandler silver. A receipt in his hand, dated 6 July 1768, survives at the foot of an account for Viscount Montagu. The Hervey family of Ickworth House were also customers. The house's silver collection contains nearly 200 pieces from Kandler's workshop, and in 1777 Augustus Hervey, 3rd Earl of Bristol ordered from him a silver-framed toilet mirror for his mistress Mary Nesbitt. Cameron writes that as the Kandlers' business turned from making plate to retailing it, the quality of much of the silver bearing their mark declined.

== Works ==
=== Earlier workshop ===
Grove Art Online discusses the earlier Charles Kandler alongside Paul de Lamerie and Nicholas Sprimont as silversmiths working in England under the influence of French rococo, especially the designs of Juste-Aurèle Meissonnier. It describes Charles's use of fully sculpted figures and high relief, in which figures project from the surface. The decoration includes mythological subjects and plant forms.

For the Jerningham wine cooler, George Vertue supplied a design and Michael Rysbrack made a wax model. Four chained leopards or panthers crouch beneath the oval bowl. Its sides show putti, figures of small children, in scenes of revelry. The cooler is now in the Hermitage Museum. Moulds taken there in 1880–1881 were used by Elkington & Co. to make silver-plated electrotype copies, including examples at the Victoria and Albert Museum and the Metropolitan Museum of Art.

A kettle and stand at the Victoria and Albert Museum, dated 1727–1737 by Grove, has a marine theme. Three mermen rise from a base on a triangular tray. Neptune and his court decorate the kettle's sides. A triton blowing a conch forms the spout, and two mermaids form the handle.

=== Frederick Kandler ===
Wine ewer bearing Kandler's mark, London, 1739–40, Art Institute of Chicago

A. V. B. Norman describes Kandler as one of the great masters of rococo silver. A pair of silver candelabra of 1738–39 in the Victoria and Albert Museum shows Hercules in a woman's robe with Iole seated on his lion skin, a subject from Ovid's Metamorphoses. The stem follows a design of 1734–35 by the French court goldsmith Thomas Germain, which the museum says Kandler took a stage further. The candelabra later belonged to Frederick, Duke of York, and were sold after his death in 1827. A silver wine ewer of 1739–40 bearing his mark is in the Art Institute of Chicago.

A backsword with a cast silver basket hilt, bearing Kandler's mark of 1739 and the London date letter for 1740–41, is in National Museums Scotland. The hilt is decorated with warriors, a drummer boy, a captive and trophies of arms among pierced rococo scrolls. A seated figure of War forms the beak of the hilt, the rear quillon is a crouching lion and the pommel is a horned owl. The sword is said to have been taken from the baggage of Charles Edward Stuart after the Battle of Culloden. It was later in the collection of George IV at Carlton House, who gave it to the chief of Clanranald, and a later chief bequeathed it to the Scottish nation. The museum records that the sword was presented to the prince by James Drummond, 3rd Duke of Perth.

In 1766–67 Kandler made a travelling set of two Torah scrolls in silver cases, with pointers that lock the cases shut, for Hayyim Samuel Jacob Falk, the "Baal Shem of London". The scrolls, which belonged to the Great Synagogue of London, were bought by the Jewish Museum London in 1992 with grants from the National Heritage Memorial Fund and the Art Fund. (Note: The National Heritage Memorial Fund's record dates the scroll cases to 1756–57; the museum's record and the Art Fund's give 1766–67.) The toilet mirror of 1777 made for Mary Nesbitt, with a bow and arrows alluding to Cupid and the Hervey arms at the base, was acquired for Ickworth in 2019.

== Family and death ==
Kandler was a Roman Catholic. His first wife, Mary, was the favourite niece of John Mathews, a Catholic priest who was latterly chaplain to the Dowager Lady Shrewsbury at Isleworth. Their son Charles was born in 1737. Mary was buried with her uncle at Isleworth on 1 April 1745. On 6 August 1749 Kandler married, at the chapel of the Bavarian embassy, Elizabeth Chamberlaine, a widow of thirty-one who brought him a dowry of £1,000. Kandler had three daughters; one may have been born during his first marriage. The Kandlers appear as godparents in the registers of the Catholic community of St James's. Elizabeth outlived her husband and died in April 1804, aged eighty-six.

On 16 October 1778 The Morning Chronicle reported: "Yesterday morning, about One o'clock, died of a fit of Apoplexy, Mr Kandler, a respectable silversmith, in Jermyn Street." He was buried with his first wife at Isleworth on 19 October. His will, made on 7 August 1767, confirmed the £1,000 secured to his wife by bond at their marriage, gave her £20 for mourning, and left the rest of his estate to his son Charles as sole executor. A codicil of 7 January 1775 added the interest on £500 for his daughter Elizabeth. The will was proved in the Prerogative Court of Canterbury in October 1778. (Note: The register copy of the will gives the date of probate as 14 October 1778, one day before the date of death reported in the Morning Chronicle.) Charles Kandler, who had long worked with his father, carried on the business for some years. He entered his mark as a plateworker at 100 Jermyn Street and is recorded there until 1793. He married Martha Pratt at St Clement Danes on 14 June 1779 and died in March 1807, leaving no surviving children.

== Sources ==
- Art Fund. "Two silver-cased Torah scrolls". Art Fund.
- Art Fund. "George III Silver Toilet Mirror Mark of Frederick Kandler". Art Fund.
- Art Institute of Chicago. "Wine Ewer". Art Institute of Chicago. Reference number 2004.718.
- Cameron, Peter (Autumn 1996). "Henry Jernegan, the Kandlers and the client who changed his mind" (PDF). The Silver Society Journal (8): 487–501. Archived from the original (PDF) on 13 June 2024.
- Cassidy-Geiger, Maureen (2006). "'Quelque chose de beau et de bon gôut': A silver-gilt toilet service for the Dresden Doppelhochzeit of 1747". Silver Studies: The Journal of the Silver Society (20): 46–57. ISSN 1743-2677. Special issue, Rococo silver in England and its colonies. ISBN 0-9549144-2-2.
- "Kandler, Charles (Frederick)". Grove Art Online. Oxford University Press. 15 July 2008 [2003]. doi:10.1093/gao/9781884446054.article.T045649.
- Grimwade, Arthur (1976). London Goldsmiths 1697–1837: Their Marks and Lives from the Original Registers at Goldsmiths' Hall and Other Sources. London: Faber and Faber. ISBN 0571105505.
- Jewish Museum London. "Travelling Torah scrolls in cases, London, 1766-67". Google Arts & Culture. Object number C 1992.2.1.
- Metropolitan Museum of Art. "Wine cistern". The Metropolitan Museum of Art.
- National Heritage Memorial Fund. "Jewish Silver from the Great Synagogue". National Heritage Memorial Fund.
- National Museums Scotland. "Backsword with an elaborately chased silver basket, presented to Prince Charles Edward Stuart by James, 3rd Duke of Perth: made by Charles Frederick Kandler, London, 1740–1741". National Museums Scotland. Museum reference H.MCR 2.
- The National Archives. "Will of Frederick Kandler, Silversmith of Saint James, Middlesex". Discovery. PROB 11/1046/165; register copy, two images.
- Norman, A. V. B. (1979). "Prince Charles Edward's silver-hilted back-sword". Proceedings of the Society of Antiquaries of Scotland. 108: 324–326. doi:10.9750/PSAS.108.324.326.
- Victoria and Albert Museum. "Candelabrum". Victoria and Albert Museum. Museum number M.9:1 to 5-2001.
