= Charles Kandler =

Charles Kandler (also Carl Kändler ) may refer to Kändler brothers, German jewellers working in the 18th century London (some sources treat their business as a single entity):

- Charles Rudolph Kandler
- Charles Frederick Kandler
