= Charles Rudolph Kandler =

German silversmith in London (1695–1753)

Carl Rudolph Kändler
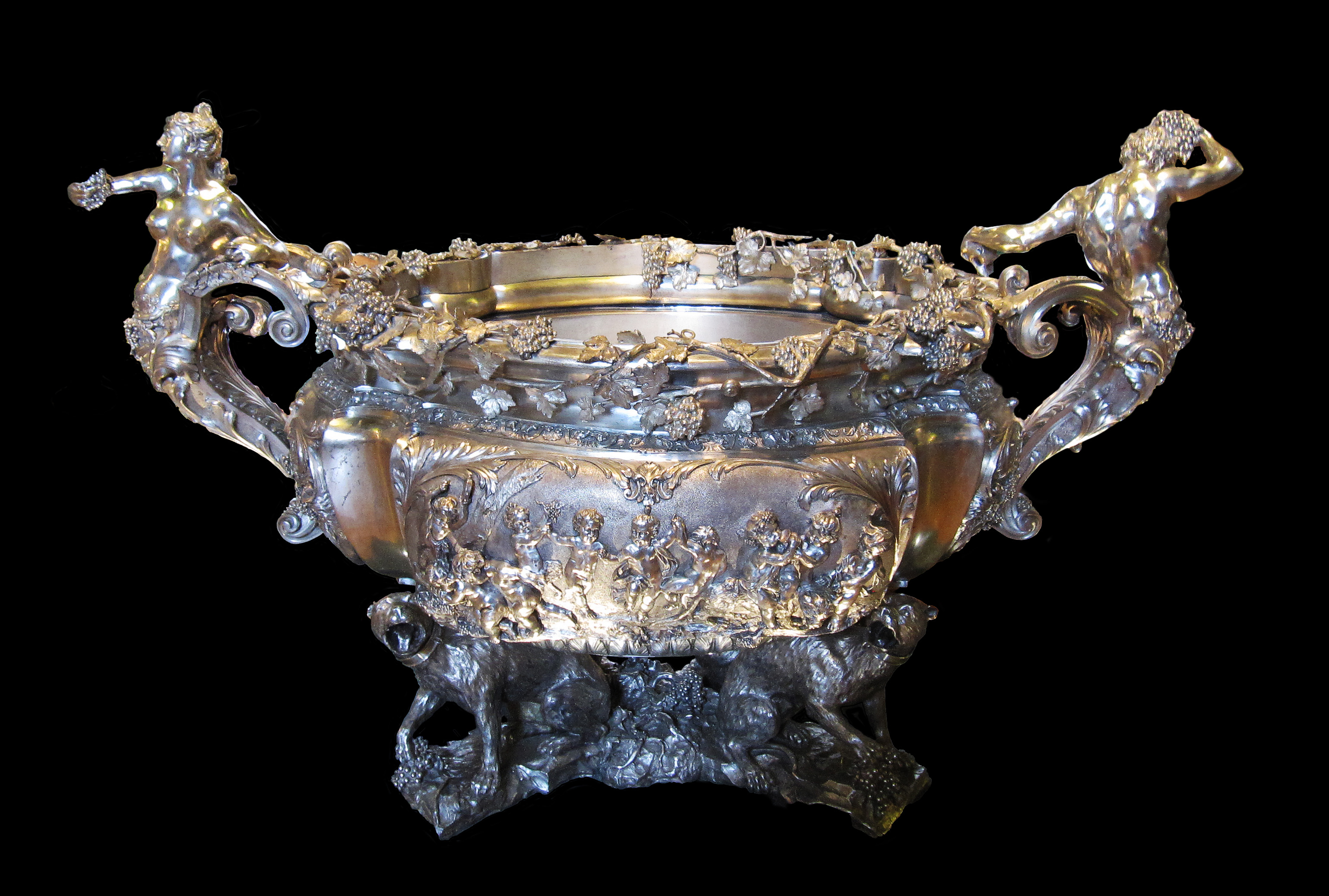
- The Jerningham wine cooler, which bears Charles Kandler's mark, in the electrotype copy at the Victoria and Albert Museum
- Born: baptised 5 March 1695
- Died: buried 27 November 1753
- Resting place: Schirgiswalde, Upper Lusatia
- Other name: Possibly Charles Kandler
- Occupations: Silversmith and goldsmith
- Years active: 1727–1735 in London (tentative identification)
- Spouse: Rebecca Maria (died 1757)
- Relatives: Johann Joachim Kändler (brother); Carl Friedrich Kändler (brother; possibly Charles Frederick Kandler)

Carl Rudolph Kändler (baptised 5 March 1695 – buried 27 November 1753) was a German silversmith and goldsmith. He was an elder brother of the Meissen porcelain modeller Johann Joachim Kändler. The silver historian Peter Cameron tentatively identified him with Charles Kandler, who worked in London from 1727 to 1735. The London silversmith's best-known work is the Jerningham wine cooler, which was ordered as the largest silver wine cistern ever made and is now in the Hermitage Museum in St Petersburg.

== Family and training ==
Carl Rudolph Kändler was baptised on 5 March 1695 at Fischbach in Saxony, the son of the Lutheran pastor Johann Joachim Kändler. In 1710 he was apprenticed to the goldsmith Johann Jacob Irminger in Dresden.

== London career ==
The Charles Kandler of Cameron's proposed identification was recorded in London by 1727. He entered his first marks at Goldsmiths' Hall on 29 August that year, in partnership with James Murray, with an address in St Martin's Lane. After Murray's death a few months later he registered a KA mark for the Britannia standard and probably a CK mark for sterling. He also used an unregistered CK mark beneath a mitre. A note found in 1979 in a gilt-metal tabernacle made for the 8th Duke of Norfolk records that Charles Kandler made it in 1730 at the sign of the mitre in St Martin's Lane. By 1732 the business was in Jermyn Street, beside St James's Church.

From 1730 Kandler appears to have been the silversmith regularly used by the goldsmith and banker Henry Jernegan (Jerningham) of Russell Street, Covent Garden. His customers included the 3rd Lord Clifford of Chudleigh, the 3rd Duke of Cleveland and the Duke of Norfolk. Cameron places him within the Roman Catholic and Tory circle to which Jernegan also belonged.

The last traced English record of Charles Kandler is dated 12 July 1735. In September 1735 Charles Frederick Kandler took over the London business, with a new mark bearing the initials FK. Cameron tentatively identifies the successor with Carl Rudolph's younger brother Carl Friedrich.

== Style and works ==
Two-handled cup and cover attributed to Charles Kandler, about 1730, Huntington Art Museum

Grove Art Online places Charles Kandler alongside Paul de Lamerie and Nicholas Sprimont among the silversmiths working in England under the influence of French rococo, especially the designs of Juste-Aurèle Meissonnier. It describes his use of fully sculpted figures and high relief, in which figures project from the surface. Mythological subjects, flowers, fruit and foliage decorate his silver.

After comparing the ornament on Kandler's relatively simple vessel shapes to early Meissen porcelain, Cameron notes German features in the vertical fluting, or grooves, of early coffee pots and soup tureens, and in the screws securing coffee-pot handles to the body. He suggests that Kandler's style continued the Baroque rather than developing a new rococo manner.

=== Jerningham wine cooler ===
Jernegan commissioned the enormous silver wine cistern for Littleton Pointz Meynell. George Vertue supplied the design and Michael Rysbrack made a wax model. Four crouching leopards or panthers support its oval bowl. Male and female terms, figures set on tapering pillars, form the handles. Panels on the sides show putti, figures of small children, in scenes of revelry. Grapes, shells, frogs and newts decorate the base.

The cistern was finished in 1734, but Meynell refused to take it, and no other buyer was found. In 1737 Jernegan disposed of it by lottery. He offered 70,000 tickets at ten shillings each, and 62,640 of them won a silver medal. The cooler is 169 cm long and 98 cm high and weighs 220 kg. By 1740 it belonged to the Empress Anna of Russia, and it is now in the Hermitage.

Moulds were taken at the Hermitage in 1880–1881 for silver-plated electrotype copies by Elkington & Co. of Birmingham. Examples are in the Victoria and Albert Museum and the Metropolitan Museum of Art. The V&A dates its copy to 1881–1884.

=== Kettle and stand ===
A silver kettle and stand in the Victoria and Albert Museum, dated 1727–1737 by Grove, has a marine theme. Three mermen rise from a base on a triangular tray. The kettle's sides show Neptune and his court in relief, surrounded by shells and seaweed. A triton blowing a conch forms the spout. Two mermaids, their tails twisted together, form the handle. The kettle bears an unregistered CK mark beneath a mitre.

== Later life ==
On 3 September 1735 a goldsmith named Kendler from Dresden visited the Meissen porcelain manufactory and called on the court commissioner Johann Gregorius Höroldt. Maureen Cassidy-Geiger suggests that this may have been Charles Kandler on his return.

The Saxon Carl Rudolph Kändler bought the paper mill at Obergurig from Johann Elsasser for 2,500 thalers. The purchase contract was dated 16 July 1742. He sold the mill to the papermaker Samuel August Schaffhirt for 2,100 thalers. The sale contract was dated 4 May 1751.

Kändler was buried at Schirgiswalde on 27 November 1753. His wife, Rebecca Maria, was of English origin and was a convert to Catholicism. She died on 11 September 1757 on the Hohe Gasse in Bautzen and was placed in the crypt at Schirgiswalde on 13 September.

== Charles Kandler and Charles Frederick Kandler ==
Arthur Grimwade, in his 1976 dictionary of London goldsmiths, treated Charles Kandler and Charles Frederick Kandler as one man, and museum and sale catalogues have often combined their work under one name. In 1996 Cameron argued from the mark registers, rate books, insurance policies and tax records that all the evidence before September 1735 refers to Charles and all the later evidence to Charles Frederick. He identified them, as a tentative thesis, with the brothers Carl Rudolph and Carl Friedrich Kändler. He noted that the London Kandlers were Roman Catholics, so two sons of a Lutheran pastor would have had to change their faith. The 2008 revision of Grove Art Online also distinguishes the two London goldsmiths, but suggests that Frederick may have been Charles's cousin or nephew.

The Hermitage catalogues the wine cooler as the work of Charles Kandler I, active in 1727–1735. A correction in the Victoria and Albert Museum's record also names Charles Kandler, although its historical account retains the older attribution to Charles Frederick elsewhere.

== Sources ==
- Bautzen, St. Petri: Tote 1661–1799 (Signatur 12) [Bautzen, St Peter's: deaths 1661–1799 (shelfmark 12)] (in German and Latin). Diocese of Dresden-Meissen. Viewer page 217 (manuscript pp. 180–181), entry no. 64, 11 September 1757 – via Matricula Online.
- Cameron, Peter (Autumn 1996). "Henry Jernegan, the Kandlers and the client who changed his mind" (PDF). The Silver Society Journal (8): 487–501. Archived from the original (PDF) on 13 June 2024.
- Cassidy-Geiger, Maureen (2006). "'Quelque chose de beau et de bon gôut': A silver-gilt toilet service for the Dresden Doppelhochzeit of 1747". Silver Studies: The Journal of the Silver Society (20): 46–57. ISSN 1743-2677. Special issue, Rococo silver in England and its colonies. ISBN 0-9549144-2-2.
- Gerichtshandelsbuch Bd. 22: GB AG Stolpen Nr. 182, 1741–1745 [Court book of the Stolpen district office, vol. 22]. 12613 Gerichtsbücher (in German). Sächsisches Staatsarchiv, Hauptstaatsarchiv Dresden. Fol. 550–554 (digitised images 688–692): purchase of the Obergurig paper mill, 16 July 1742, with confirmation of January 1744 – via Beständeübersicht.
- Gerichtshandelsbuch Bd. 24: GB AG Stolpen Nr. 184, 1748–1753 [Court book of the Stolpen district office, vol. 24]. 12613 Gerichtsbücher (in German). Sächsisches Staatsarchiv, Hauptstaatsarchiv Dresden. Fol. 574–577 (digitised images 614–617): sale of the Obergurig paper mill, 4 May 1751, confirmed 8 July 1751 – via Beständeübersicht.
- "Kandler, Charles (Frederick)". Grove Art Online. Oxford University Press. 15 July 2008 [2003]. doi:10.1093/gao/9781884446054.article.T045649.
- Grimwade, Arthur (1976). London Goldsmiths 1697–1837: Their Marks and Lives from the Original Registers at Goldsmiths' Hall and Other Sources. London: Faber and Faber. ISBN 0571105505.
- Schirgiswalde: Tote 1725–1831 (Signatur 26) [Schirgiswalde: deaths 1725–1831 (shelfmark 26)] (in German). Diocese of Dresden-Meissen. Viewer page 37, manuscript p. 70, entries for 1753 – via Matricula Online.
- State Hermitage Museum. "Wine-Cooler". The State Hermitage Museum: Digital Collection. Inventory number Э-7041. Archived from the original on 16 September 2024.
- Victoria and Albert Museum. "Wine cistern". Victoria and Albert Museum. Museum number REPRO.1884:1-122.
