= François Briot =

French medallist and goldsmith (1550-1616)

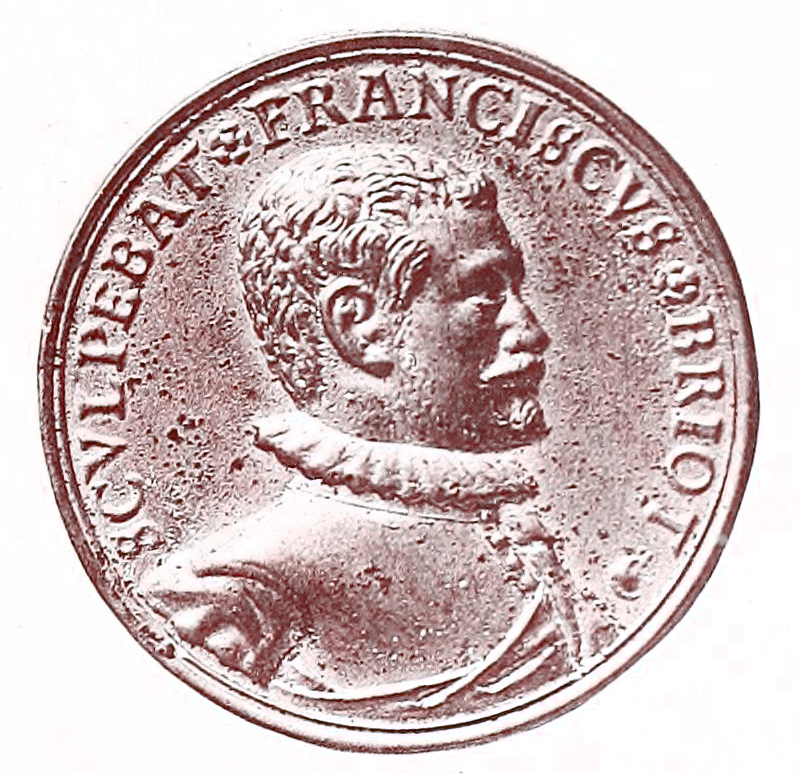
- Born: François Briot; 1550; Damblain, Duchy of Lorraine
- Died: 26 April 1616 (aged 65–66); Montbéliard (Mömpelgard), County of Württemberg
- Other name: Cellini of Pewter
- Father: Urbain Briot

François Briot (1550 – 26 April 1616) was a French medallist, engraver, and goldsmith.

== Early life ==
François Briot was born in 1550 in Damblain in the Duchy of Lorraine (present-day Vosges, France).

Briot inherited both his Protestant faith and his pewterer's trade from his Huguenot family in Lorraine. In 1579, he left the Catholic-controlled Lorraine and took refuge in Mömpelgard (now Montbéliard) amid the tumultuous French Wars of Religion.

== Career ==
Records document Briot's acceptance into the Corporation of Saint Eligius, the guild of metalworkers under the patronage of the goldsmiths' saint, in 1580. He was sworn into the guild on 12 April 1580, by Jehan Morel, the guild master, and Richard Jalloux, a guild servant.

Briot's earliest known work is a medal from 1585 depicting a three-year-old Prince John Frederick of Württemberg, son of the sovereign Count of Montbéliard. Around this time, Briot became chief engraver to Frederick I. By the following year, Briot appeared in the ranks of the burghers of Montbéliard.

In addition to seal engraving, he executed his work on embossed pewter, in particular, fine rosewater dishes and companion ewers, decorated with arabesque ornaments in low relief. Early pewter use in France and Germany was mainly used by the court, the nobility, and high-ranking church officials, whose tastes emphasized more complex shapes and more ornate decoration than those found in England. Briot's chef-d'œuvre is a famous pewter basin representing Temperance. It is said to have been created between 1585 and 1590.

He engraved two medals in 1593 depicting the effigy and arms of Prince John Frederick, who later inherited the Duchy of Württemberg. He also executed a medal for Duke Frederick of Württemberg when he was made a Knight of the Garter.

Briot served as an engraver to the Mint at Stuttgart from 1593 to 1609.

Around 1601, he was implicated in the accounts of Laurent de Willermin, who had received large sums from Frederick I to search for fictitious lead and silver mines in Franche-Comté. The resulting legal proceedings ruined Briot financially. He was ordered to pay a settlement of 6,752 florins and 11 batzen.

In Montbéliard, he engraved a metal half-coin bearing the image of Emperor Matthias for the ceremonial coinage of the Besançon municipality between 1614 and 1615. During 1615, he was in Besançon supporting a coin-minting press invented by his relative Nicholas Briot.

== Personal life ==
His brother was Didier Briot, who also emigrated from Lorraine and became an engraver. Isaac Briot and Nicholas Briot, both engravers, were his nephews.

== Death ==
François Briot died on 26 April 1616, in Montbéliard, France.

== Legacy ==
France's most notable pewterer was François Briot. Briot was particularly noted for elevating pewter to an artistic medium, producing works admired for their elegance, disciplined figural design, and inventive bas-relief ornamentation. His works have been regarded by French collectors as among the finest examples of 16th-century pewter craftsmanship.

One of Briot's designs was reproduced by German metalworker Caspar Enderlein, perhaps the most celebrated pewterer after him. Bernard Palissy reproduced one of the best known and most popular models of his pewter ewers and dishes in his enameled earthenware. The 1884 Venus Rosewater Dish by Elkington and Co. was based on one of Briot’s original designs.

A signed pewter salver by Briot, one of twelve known examples and once part of the Georges Spetz collection, was purchased by T. D. Einstein for $140 at the American Art Galleries in New York in February 1925. It was later donated to the Saint Louis Art Museum by Milton I. D. Einstein in 1957. Among the 11 remaining salvers by Briot at the time, locations included the Louvre in Paris; the Victoria and Albert Museum in London; the Kaiser Friedrich Museum in Berlin; and museums in Cologne, Munich, and Dresden, with the rest privately owned. The Louvre Paris has preserved a basin with relief work by Briot made for Henry III of France. In 1828, the Louvre acquired a ewer and dish from the collection of Pierre Révoil. The Victoria and Albert Museum houses a salver featuring a relief scene of Susanna and the Elders. It entered the V&A's collection in 1855 after being bought from the Ralph Bernal collection. By the beginning of the 20th century, the Musée de Cluny had acquired a pewter ewer by Briot, decorated with relief figures and ornaments. The Montbéliard Museum also displayed a half-coin signed by Briot depicting a bust portrait of the Duke of Württemberg.
