= Maurice Achener =

French painter

Maurice Victor Achener (17 September 1881 – 19 April 1963) was a French illustrator, painter, and print maker.

== Biography ==
Maurice Achener was an Alsatian from Mulhouse, born September 17, 1881.

The artist studied at a fine arts school in Strausberg (l'école des arts décoratifs de Strasbourg). He pursued further studies at the Arts Academy in Munich. There, he was a student of Ludwig von Löfftz and of Peter Halm, who introduced him to etching.

In 1901 Émile Schneider and Georges Ritleng created a group of artists called the Alsatian Artist Society (in French: la Société des artistes alsaciens). This society counted among its members Maurice Achner, Daniel Schoen, Hansi, Alexandre Urbain, and N. Forsberg. Achner developed a friendship with André Engel, who was also from Mulhouse. His etchings were published in "la Revue alasacienne illustrée" (the Illustrated Alsatian Review), a periodical edited by Charles Spindler.

He also became friends with the etcher and sculptor Maurice Bastide du Lude, at a studio situated at the Château du Lude near Orléans where they both worked. He created several small prints of his etchings which are still owned by the descendants of Bastide du Lude.

Maurice Achener settled down in Paris in 1905. From 1907 to 1908, he worked with Jean-Paul Laurens.

After becoming a French citizen in 1913, he participated in the First World War on the French coast under the family name of his wife, Émilie Patry. Patry, whose family was from Geneva, was the cousin of Mathilde Paravicini. Achner never stopped working and was highly recognized for his etching talents. After a long career as an artist, he died in Paris on April 19, 1963.

== Works ==
His work was mainly of landscapes, created based on real life, as well as on numerous designs and paintings which he then used for his etchings. He eventually began working directly on the slab. Each engraving went through many "stages." He would carefully research which paper would work best for his prints. He created his own inks. He was a precise and thorough printmaker, but his work was poetic and, although it is considered to be in the classical tradition, deeply personal.

He often drew Paris but also covered the rest of France as he was commissioned to do so. He illustrated Alsace, the Alps, with a partiality to Notre-Dame-de-Bellecombe, Provence, the region of Poitiers, Carcassonne, Corsica and Brittany. He also visited Italy, Germany, and Switzerland. He spent time in Tunisia and in the United States, where his works were purchased by major collectors.

He created nearly 550 prints, mainly with etching and drypoint. He also worked with oil paints and used pastel for some of his beautiful portraits, notably those of children in his family.

Jean-Eugène Bersier described him in 1963 as such: "The printmakers Beaufrère, Mac Langhlan, Achener represent a diverse collection of honest and solid art."

== Illustrations ==
- Théodolinde Waldner de Freundstein: The Alsatian legend by Georges Spetz (printed and sold by Lahure),1909.
- Widesaft by Albert Matthis with Adolphe Matthis (Stoosburri, Strausberg, Alsatian printer), book conserved in the Bibliothèque nationale de France, 1911.
- La Princesse Maleine by Maeterlinck, 1918.
- Le Feu de Gabriele D'Annunzio, 1919.
- Paysages de Paris by Léandre Vaillat. The Compagnie Générale Transatlantique asked him to illustrate this book to offer to passengers in commemoration of the release of the ocean liner the Paris, 1919.
- La Faute de l'Abbé Mouret de Zola (Mornay), woodcarvings, book conserved at the Bibliothèque nationale de France, 1922.
- Monsieur des Lourdines by Alphonse de Chateaubriant, recipient of the Goncourt Prize in 1911 (A & G Mornay Libraires,), 1925.
- La Première journée de la bergerie by Remy Belleau (Société des médecins bibliophiles), 1945.
