= Georges Spetz =

French painter, poet, and art collector (1844-1914)

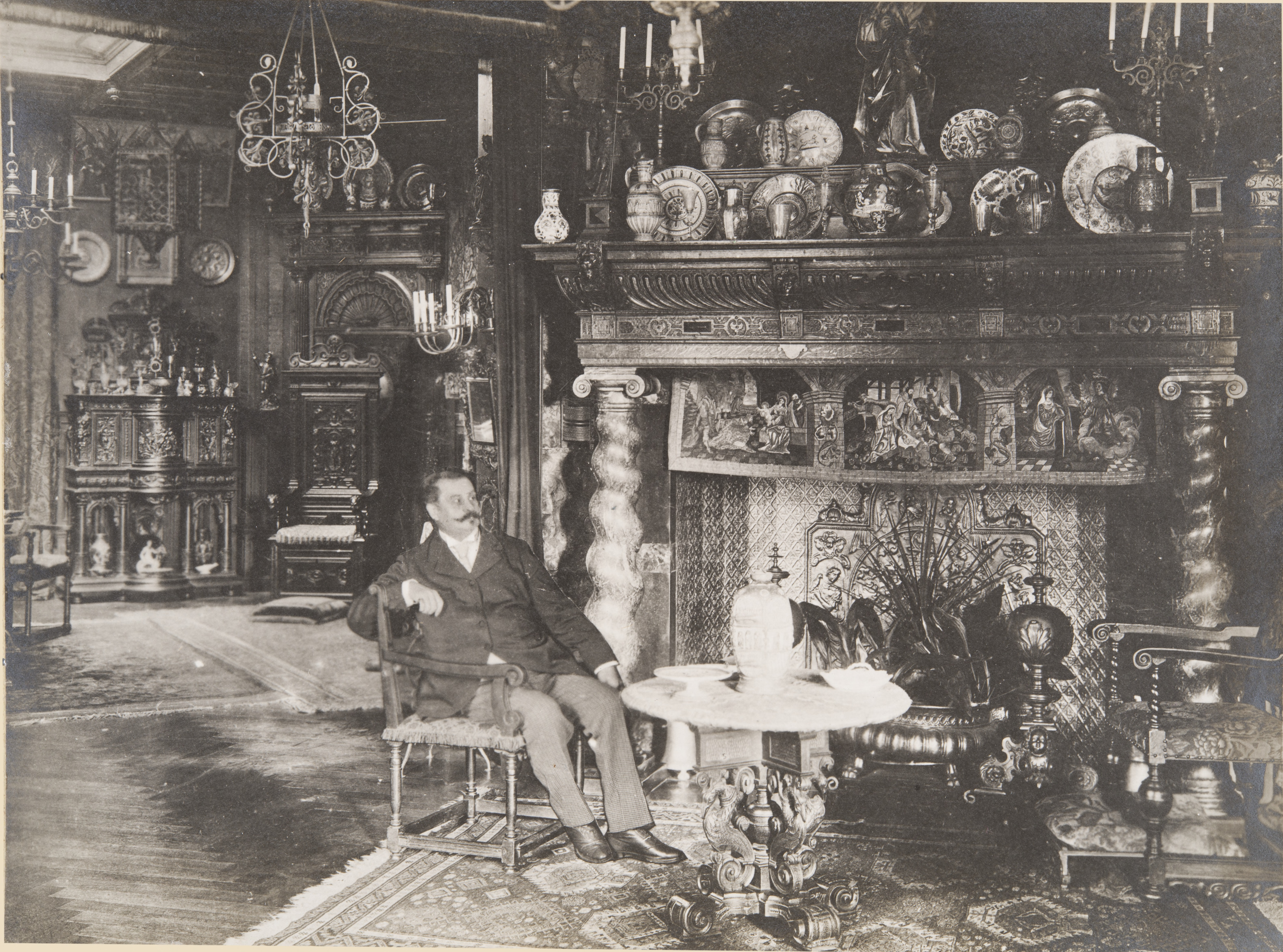
- M. Spetz in Issenheim (1910)
- Born: Jean-Baptiste Mathias Georges Spetz; May 31, 1844; Issenheim, Alsace, France
- Died: November 11, 1914 (aged 70); Issenheim, Alsace, Germany
- Known for: painting, art collecting, poetry
- Father: Jean-Baptiste Spetz
- Awards: Prix Broquette-Gonin (1913)

Georges Spetz (May 31, 1844 – November 11, 1914) was a French painter, poet, art collector, composer, and writer.

== Early life and education ==
Jean-Baptiste Mathias Georges Spetz was born in the village of Issenheim, located in the Haut-Rhin region of Alsace, France, on May 31, 1844.

His father, the industrialist Jean-Baptiste Spetz, was a wealthy textile manufacturer based in Issenheim. When Georges's mother died in 1853, the 9-year-old boy was sent to Colmar with his maternal grandmother and attended a private school. He went on to study at the Collège Sainte-Barbe in Paris, where he received his Bachelor of Science.

== Career ==
After graduating, he returned to Issenheim to join the family business, but his passion for art made him lose interest in industry. It led him to study painting under the Swiss artist Franz Ludwig von Niederhaeusern who moved to the Mulhouse district in 1862. Following two winters of work in Rome in 1868 and 1869, he relocated to Paris, where he spent time with Auguste Boulard and met French painter Jean-Jacques Henner. He specialized in landscape painting, particularly rural scenes in Alsace and around Issenheim. He earned admission to the Paris Salon (Salon des Artistes Français) in 1870.

During the 1870s, he turned his attention to music and poetry. He became a pupil of Antoine and Joseph Heyberger of the Concordia of Mulhouse. Spetz presided over the Issenheim Brass Band, founded on April 18, 1874, and personally financed its instruments. In 1876, the band performed his composition Mascarade.

Beginning in 1875, Spetz started collecting art, eventually forming a well-known private collection. He filled his Alsatian residence with paintings, sculpture, and various art objects. Spetz's collection was heavy on late medieval and Renaissance European metalwork—bronze mortars, pewter by François Briot, Gothic ironwork, Renaissance brass, and high-end ceremonial vessels. His interests extended to ceramic wares produced in Strasbourg, Rouen, Delft, Moustiers, and multiple other locales. The collection brought together French faience from the 16th and 17th centuries, examples of Hispano-Moresque ware and Delftware, Chinese porcelain, Venetian glass, and Bohemian glass spanning the 16th to 18th centuries.

Following the death of his father, Jean-Baptiste Spetz, in 1878, he became co-owner of the J.-B. Spetz & Cie factory. Shortly after, Georges handed full control of the business to his brother-in-law, Eugène Louis Constant Carpentier. The facility was called the Spetz-Carpentier spinning mill from 1879 to 1918.

He joined the Industrial Society of Mulhouse (Société industrielle de Mulhouse) in 1882. He took part in the work of the History, Statistics, and Geography Committee, and the Fine Arts Committee. Spetz emerged as a key participant, earning the Grand Gold Medal in 1912 for the scope of his contributions. He also exhibited at the Société des Arts de Mulhouse between 1886 and 1914.

In 1897, he came into possession of newly discovered miniature portraits of Joan of Arc, which were believed to come from a 15th-century manuscript. He allowed The Century Magazine to publish the first black-and-white reproduction.

Spetz compiled Alsatian Biographies (Biographies alsaciennes) at the turn of the century, accompanied by illustrations from Charles Spindler.

His renowned art collection was reviewed by art critic Anselme Laugel in 1900 in the Revue alsacienne illustrée, a publication based in Strasbourg.

Spetz was among the founders of the Alsatian Museum (Musée alsacien) in Strasbourg, established on November 3, 1902. At the general meeting following its incorporation, a supervisory board was elected, composed of Laugel (president), Robert Forrer, Maurice Oesinger, and Spetz.

One of his most popular works, the Legends of Alsace (Legendes d'Alsace), was published in 1905 in Strasbourg. The book's frontispiece was executed by Jean-Jacques Henner. Spetz retold Alsace's traditional legends in classical verse. The collection of poems is divided into three sections: Religious Legends, Historical Legends, and Fantastic Legends. He received recognition from the French Academy in 1913 and was awarded the first Prix Broquette-Gonin.

In 1909, the Institut de France awarded him a prize of 10,000 francs for his collection of Alsatian antiquities. He notably held the Isenheim Altarpiece in his collection.

He published Théodelinde Waldner of Freundstein in 1909, featuring 26 engravings created by Alsatian artist Maurice Achener. He went on to write Gourmet Alsace (L'Alsace gourmande), a poem published by the Revue alsacienne illustrée in 1914. The poem devoted to Alsatian cuisine was accompanied by 140 recipes and illustrated by Jeanne Riss.

== Death ==
Georges Spetz died in Issenheim, Haut-Rhin, Alsace, German Empire, on November 11, 1914.

After his death, his art collection was consficated by German authorities in June 1915, amid World War I, and relocated to the Rohan Palace, as reported by Journal des débats. After Alsace was returned to France in 1919, Spetz's heirs sought to sell the collection to the city of Colmar, home to the Unterlinden Museum. When the negotiations failed, it was temporarily stored in Sélestat under the care of librarian-archivist Joseph Walter. By 1920, the famous collection of Georges Spetz was exhibited in the main reading room of the Humanist Library of Sélestat. The heirs of Georges Spetz eventually entrusted the sale of the whole collection to a Swiss antique dealer in early 1924. Spetz's antique collection was sold off in a public sale at the American Art Galleries in New York in February 1925. At the time, the Louvre Paris acquired a life-size wooden Vierge à l'Enfant statue from the Spetz collection.

== Works ==
- Biographies alsaciennes, 1900
- Legendes d'Alsace, 1905
- Théodelinde Waldner de Freundstein, 1909
- L'Alsace gourmande, 1914

== Awards ==
- Prix Broquette-Gonin (1913)

== Gallery ==
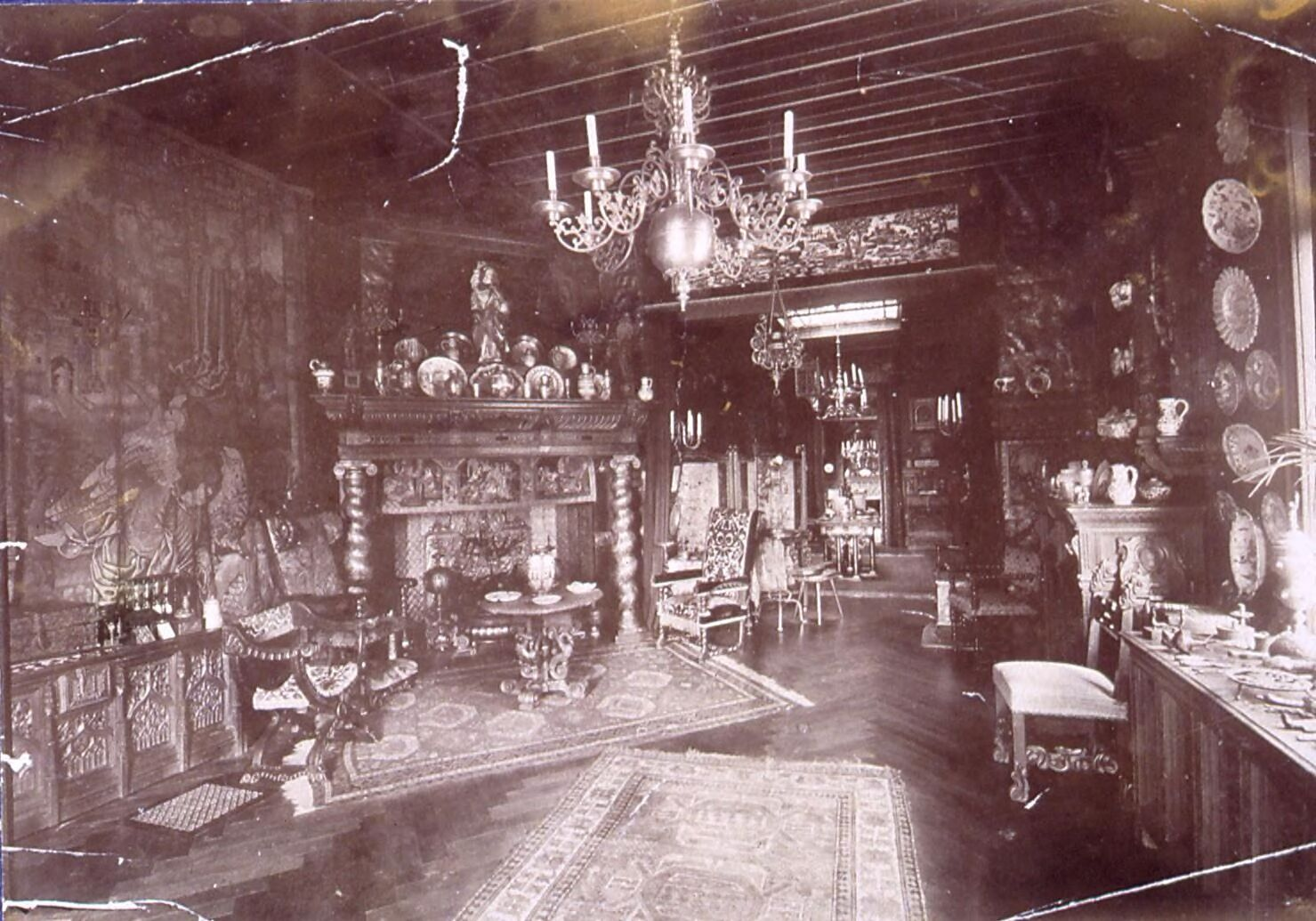
Spetz's living room, Issenheim, 1890
