= Nicholas Briot =

English sculpteur and medalist

Nicholas Briot (about 1579 – 24 December 1646) was a French-English coin engraver, medallist and mechanical engineer. Born in France, he emigrated to England and became chief engraver to the Royal Mint in 1633 and is credited with the invention of the coining-press.

== France ==
He was born Nicolas Briot at Damblain, in Lorraine, in the Vosges department of France, a frontier town famous for its bellfounding and metalworking industries. He is one of a distinguished Huguenot family of patternmakers, diecutters and craftsmen in metal in the 16th and 17th centuries, whose members included François Briot, master pewterer and medallist represented in the main national collections (uncle of Nicolas), and Etienne Briot, engraver. His father, Didier, and brother, Isaac, were both notable medallists.

After serving his apprenticeship, Briot travelled to Montbéliard and Langres in 1599, where he produced his first portrait engravings. He migrated to Paris in 1605, where he was appointed engraver-general (chief engraver) at the Monnaie de Paris (Paris Mint) in 1605–6, and produced coronation medals for the young Louis XIII.

He began to experiment with the mechanisation of French coin production, developing improvements in the 'balancier' presses introduced from Nuremberg in Germany for striking coins and promoting a 'mill and engines which will prevent counterfeiting' which he submitted to the Paris authorities in 1615. In that year he published 'Raisons, moyens et propositions pour faire toutes les monnaies du royaume, a l'avenir, uniformes, et pour cesser toutes fabrications, etc.' He promoted the coining press to replace the traditional hammer-striking methods of coinage production, the prototype of which is generally attributed to the engraver Antoine Brucher who had first tried it about 1553 for the coining of counters in the court of Henri III. Briot, however, was unable to convince the French government to adopt his new technology, and was accused of fraud.

== England and Scotland ==
Briot fled to England in 1625, pursued by creditors, and offered his services and machinery to Charles I of England. He met with more success than in France, and in 1626 he was commissioned to make puncheons and dies for 'certain pieces of largesse of gold and silver in memory of his Majesty's coronation', producing his successful Coronation Medal, the first of the sequence of medals for Charles I, in that year. This established his reputation, when he was given 'power and authority to frame and engrave the first designs and effigies of the king's image ... to serve in coins of gold and silver'. He went on to produce a considerable number of dies and moulds for medals and coins in the following years.

In 1633, he was sent to Scotland to prepare and coin the coronation pieces of Charles I, as well as the Scottish Coronation Medal (1633). His Coronation medals and the 'Dominion of the Seas' medal (1630) demonstrated his artistic skill and the technical superiority of the new coining machinery. On the death of Sir John Foulis, Master of the Mint in Scotland, Briot was appointed to the office in 1635, and superintended the Scottish coinage for several years.

Briot was recalled to England by the king and was appointed chief engraver to the Royal Mint in 1633. On the outbreak of the English Civil War he followed Charles I to York and Oxford; 'he took possession of the punches, roller instruments, and coining apparatus at the Tower, by order of his Majesty, and had them removed, trussed up in saddles, at the hazard of his life, for the purpose of continuing the coining operations in the cause of the King'.

He travelled to France in 1641 and 1645, sending presses to his brother Isaac, now in a senior position at the Paris Mint. He died on Christmas Eve 1646.

His dies for coins and medals have been called "gems of medallic art".

== Family ==
His daughter Esther Briot married John Falconer, Master of the Scottish Mint. Their children included James Falconer, Lord Phesdo.

== Other sources ==
- Dauban (1857). "Nicolas Briot". Revue numismatique.
- Hawkins, E.; Franks, A. W.; Grueber, H. A. (1885). Medallic Illustrations of the History of Great Britain and Ireland to the Death of George II. London: Trustees of the British Museum. Reprinted Spink, 1969.
- Jones, M. (1988). A catalogue of the French Medals in the British Museum. Vol. 2: 1600-1672. London: British Museum Publications Ltd.
