= Jerningham wine cooler =

18th century silver wine cooler

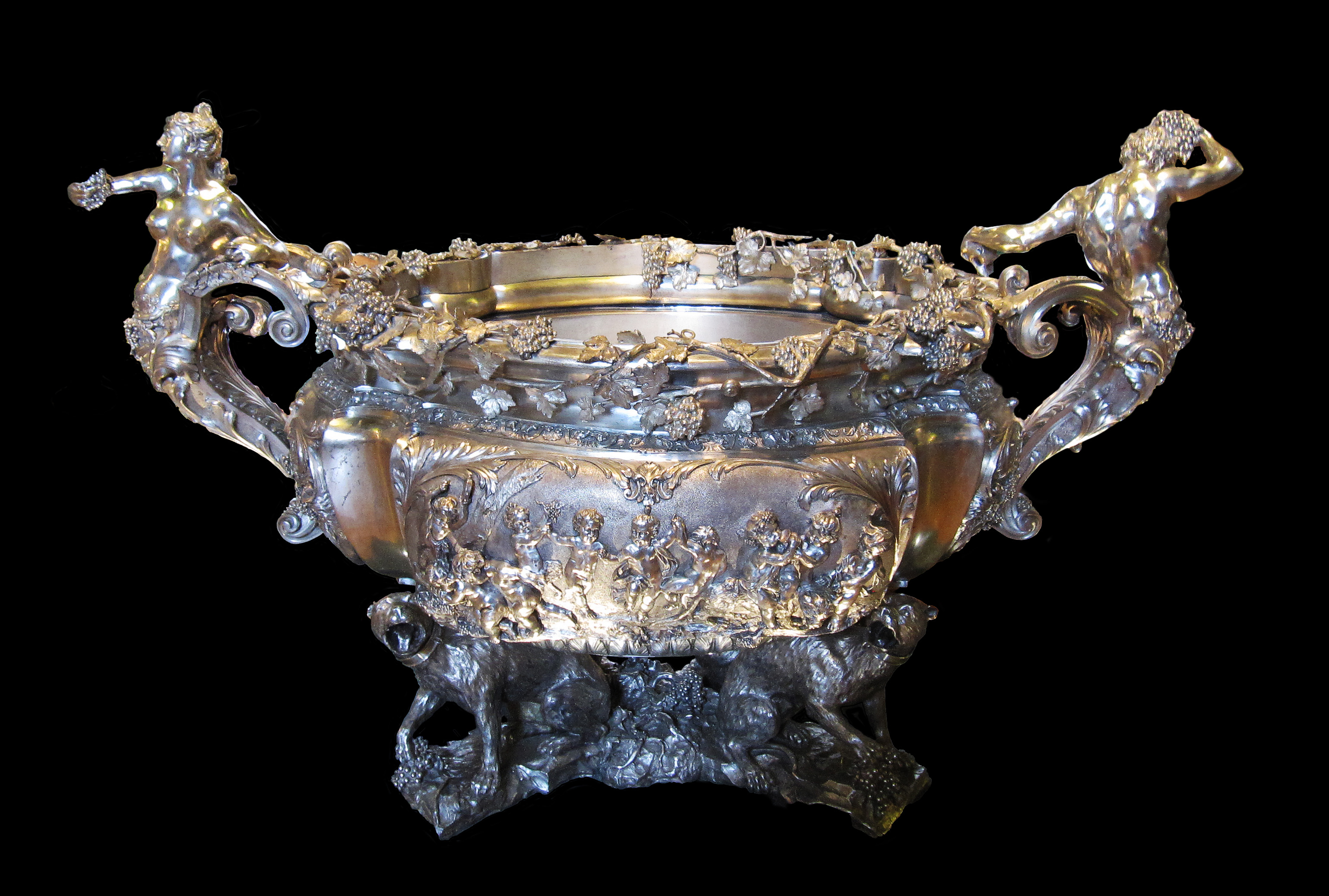
Electrotype copy of the Jerningham wine cooler in the V&A Museum, London

The Jerningham wine cooler is a large wine cooler made out of silver in the 18th century.

The original was commissioned 1734–1735 in London by Henry Jernegan (Jerningham) of Russell Street, a London goldsmith-banker, whose client, Littleton Poyntz Meynell, wanted to have the largest silver wine cistern ever to have been made. Jernegan employed the sculptor John Michael Rysbrack to model the Bacchanalian scenes on the bowl, the crouching panthers beneath and the satyr handles. It took a team of silversmiths, chasers and engravers four years to make and weighed 8,000 troy ounces (548 lb, 9 oz.; 248.8kg).

The leading silversmith, whose CK mark is struck on the cistern, was the German immigrant, Charles Kandler (probably Carl Rudolph Kändler, elder brother of the famous Meissen porcelain modeller Johann Joachim Kändler). This identification is subject of speculations, as there is only one contemporary (1740) record available, "The Plate working Silver Smith ... Kendelar a German".

When asked by Henry Jernegan to pay the final bill for the cistern, however, Meynell refused and in 1737, Jernegan offered the cooler as a lottery prize. The smallest prizes in the lottery were specially struck medals about five or six shillings each. The winner, Major William Battine of East Marden, Sussex, appears to have sold the cooler to the regent Grand Duchess Anna Leopoldovna of Russia in 1738. Since 1743 the cooler has been in the Hermitage Museum, St. Petersburg.

An electrotype (silver on copper core) copy was made during the Victorian Age in 1884 in Birmingham by Elkington & Co. in celebration of the original. This copy (see photo) is now located in the Victoria and Albert Museum. There is another electrotype copy in the Metropolitan Museum in New York, and also in the Queen's Regimental Silver in England.

== Sources ==
- Cameron, Peter (Autumn 1996). "Henry Jernegan, the Kandlers and the client who changed his mind" (PDF). The Silver Society Journal (8): 487–501. Archived from the original (PDF) on 13 June 2024.
