= Guy Hannen =

British Army officer (1924–2015)

Guy Hannen

Lancelot Guy Michael Hannen MC (20 August 1924 - 11 April 2015) was a British Army officer of the Second World War who won the Military Cross for his part in holding Pidéura, Italy, in 1944 despite fierce German attacks. The citation noted Hannen's courage, leadership and endurance.

Hannen was educated at Eton College, the son of Lancelot Hannen CBE, senior partner at auction house Christie's.

After leaving the Army in 1947, Hannen followed in the family footsteps by joining Christie's, where he rose to be managing director.
