= Arthur Grimwade =

British antiquarian

Arthur Girling Grimwade FSA (10 February 1913 in London – 21 November 2002) was a British antiquarian known for his work in the history of silversmithing and goldsmithing, a field in which he was "highly respected" and a "world authority". He spent 20 years writing the reference work London Goldsmiths 1697-1837: Their Marks & Lives, which was published in 1976; he also wrote numerous other reference works and scholarly articles, beginning with a 1947 article in Country Life about items in the collection of the Ashmolean Museum.

In 1932, Grimwade began work at Christie's auction house (despite his father having wanted him to work at the Bank of England); as a trainee, his salary was £1 a week. After serving in the Second World War as a signaller, he returned to Christie's in 1946. On 30 April 1954, he was promoted to director, a position he held until 1979. During this time, he worked with Guy Hannen, and, while valuating the assets of Burghley House, discovered the artefact now known as the Burghley Nef "neglected and black in a cellar".

In "the 1950s", Grimwade joined the Worshipful Company of Goldsmiths, where he was "the first person to be given official access to their mark books, [which were] until then a secret in-house resource;" in 1984, he served as the Goldsmiths' Prime Warden.

In 1953, he became a Fellow of the Royal Society of Antiquaries, and in 1962, he was honorary curator for the Honourable Artillery Company.

In 1971, he visited California, serving as a guest lecturer in silver artefacts at the University of California, Davis.
