= Venus Rosewater Dish =

Wimbledon Ladies' Singles trophy

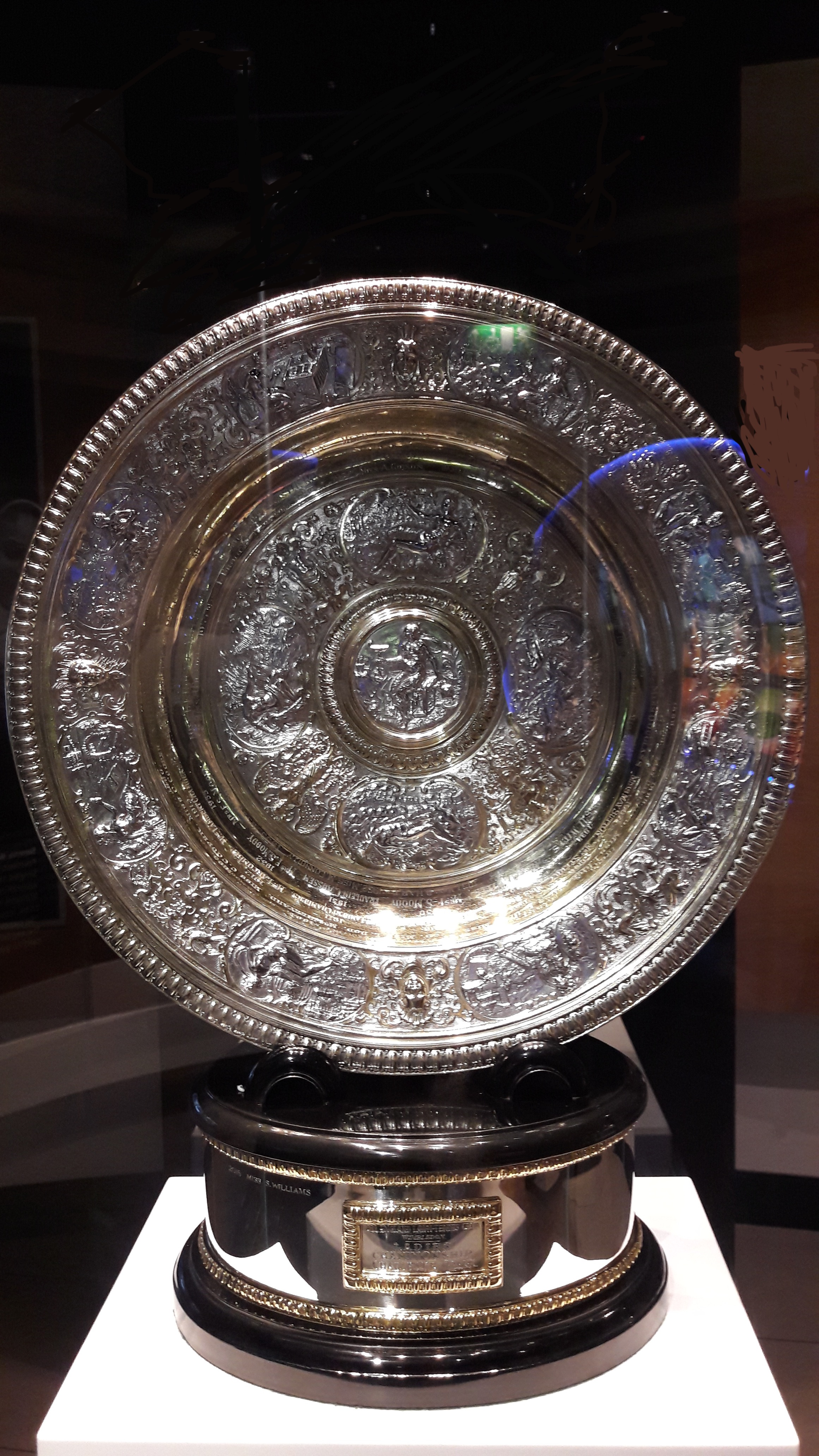
Venus Rosewater Dish at the All England Club museum

The Venus Rosewater Dish is the Ladies' Singles Trophy awarded at The Championships, Wimbledon, and was first presented in 1886.

A rosewater dish is a ceremonial platter or basin used to catch rosewater from ewers and poured over the hands to wash them–a daily ceremony in England. Such dishes were later used for display only. A salver (Latin salva, save from risk) was originally used by food tasters who tested food for poison. A rosewater dish was considered a salver by extension. These dishes were made of pewter, silver, or gold.

The 50-guinea trophy is an 18 3/4-inch (48 cm) diameter, partially gilded, sterling silver salver made in 1864 by Elkington & Co. of Birmingham, and is a copy of an electrotype by Caspar Enderlein from a Renaissance pewter original in the Louvre.

It is tradition for the winner to be awarded the trophy and then walk a lap around the court to display the trophy to the crowd and photographers. The winner does not keep the trophy, which remains in the museum at the All-England Club. From 1949 to 2006, all champions received a miniature replica of the trophy (diameter 8 inches (20 cm)), and from 2007 all champions have received a three-quarter replica of the trophy, bearing the names of all past champions (diameter 14 inches (36 cm)).

Being a reproduction of a Paris museum antique, the theme of decoration is related not to tennis but Classical mythology. The central boss depicts the figure of Sophrosyne (not Venus), the personification of temperance and moderation, seated on a chest with a lamp in her right hand and a jug in her left, with various attributes such as a sickle, fork and caduceus around her. The four reserves on the boss of the dish each contain a classical god, together with elements. The reserves around the rim show Minerva presiding over the seven liberal arts: astronomy, geometry, arithmetic, music, rhetoric, dialectic and grammar, each with relevant attribute. The rim of the salver has an ovolo moulding. The remainder of the surface is decorated with gilt renaissance strapwork and foliate motifs in relief against a rigid silver ground.

The first recipient of the trophy was Blanche Bingley in 1886. The name of Maud Watson, champion of 1884 and 1885, was later added. The names of the winners from 1884 to 1957 are inscribed on the inside of the dish, and the names of 1958 to present on the outside.

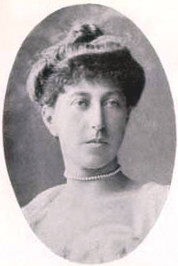
Blanche Bingley Hillyard, first recipient of the Venus Rosewater Dish

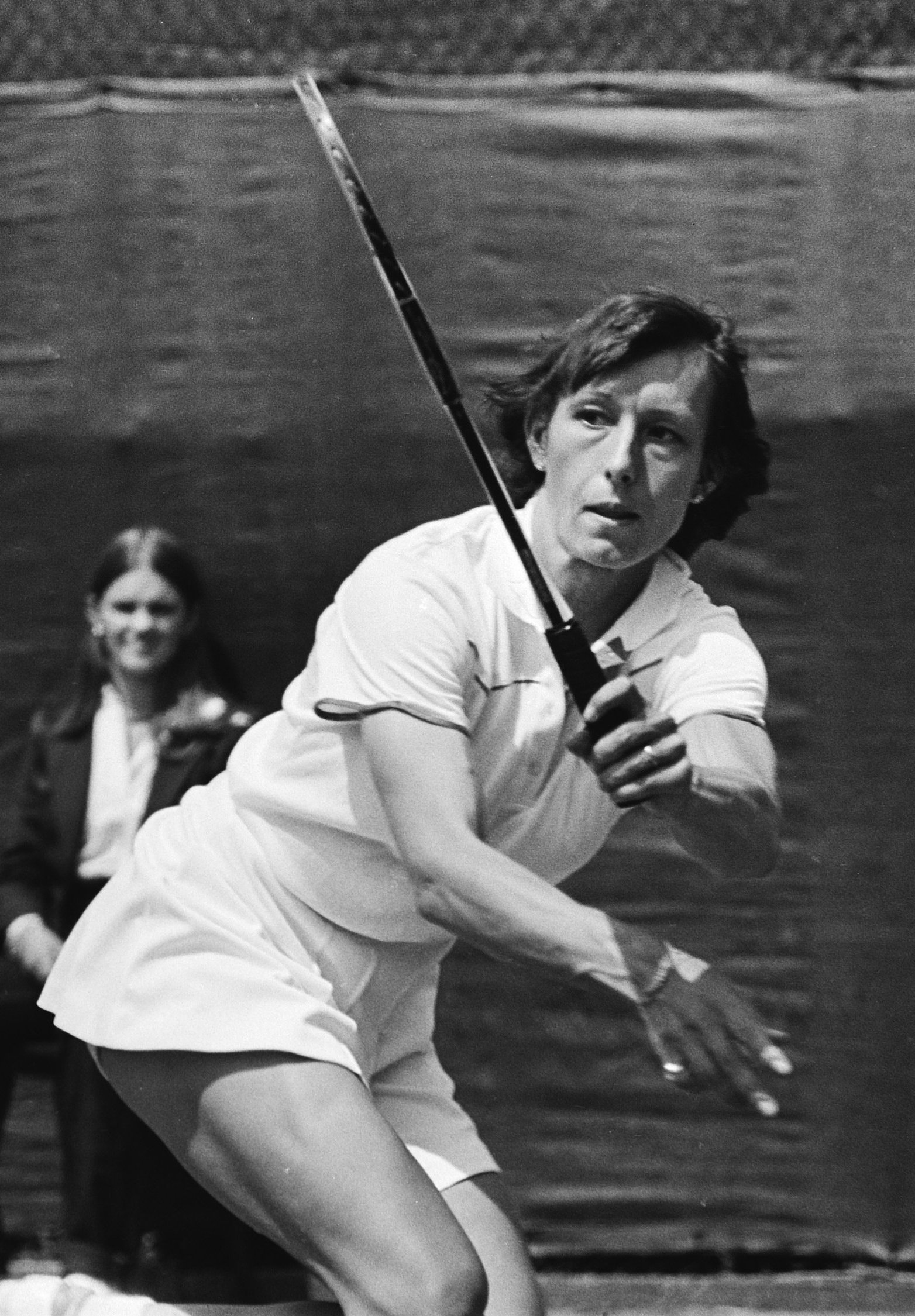
Martina Navratilova, most times winner of the Venus Rosewater Dish with 9 titles

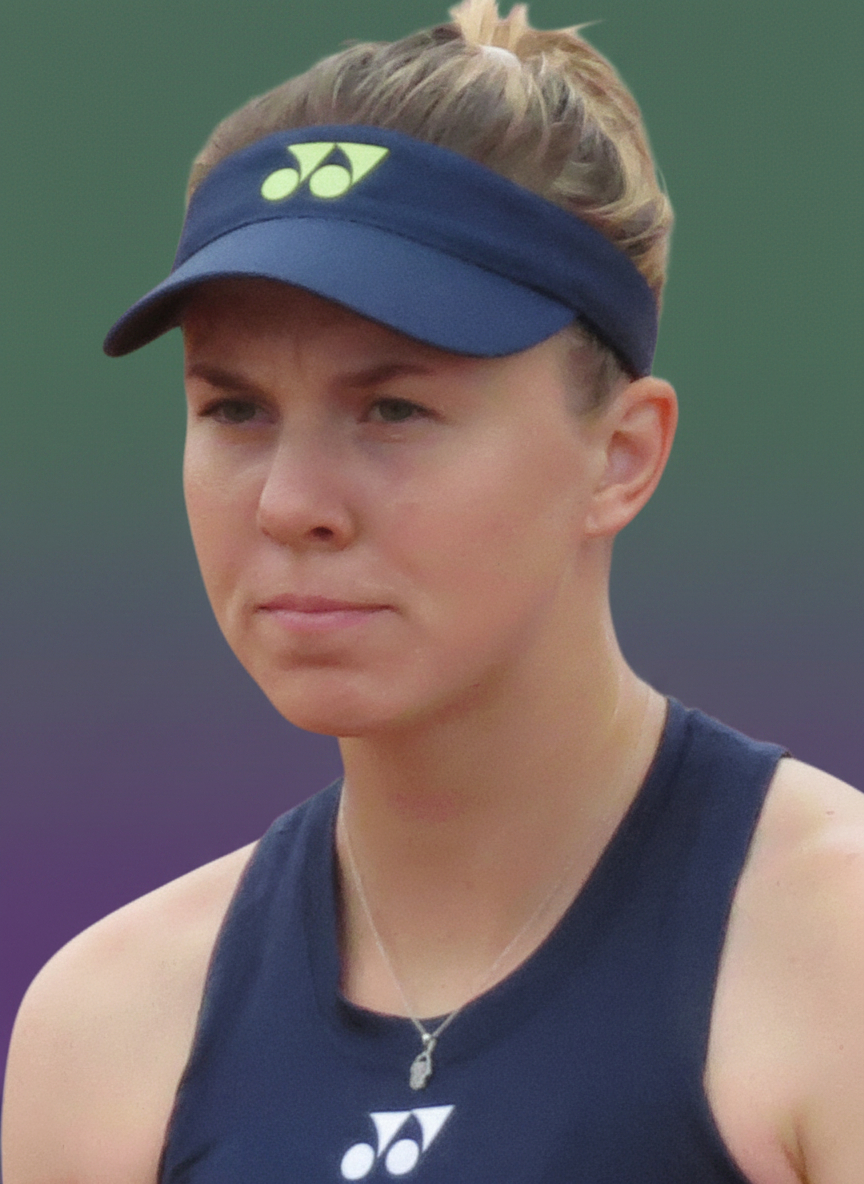
Linda Nosková, current holder of the Venus Rosewater Dish

== See also ==
- List of Wimbledon ladies' singles champions
- Wimbledon Championships

== Bibliography ==
- Little, Alan (2006). Wimbledon Compendium, 2006. All England Lawn Tennis and Croquet Club. ISBN 978-1-89903-925-8.
