= Mathilde Paravicini =

Swiss philanthropist (1875–1954)

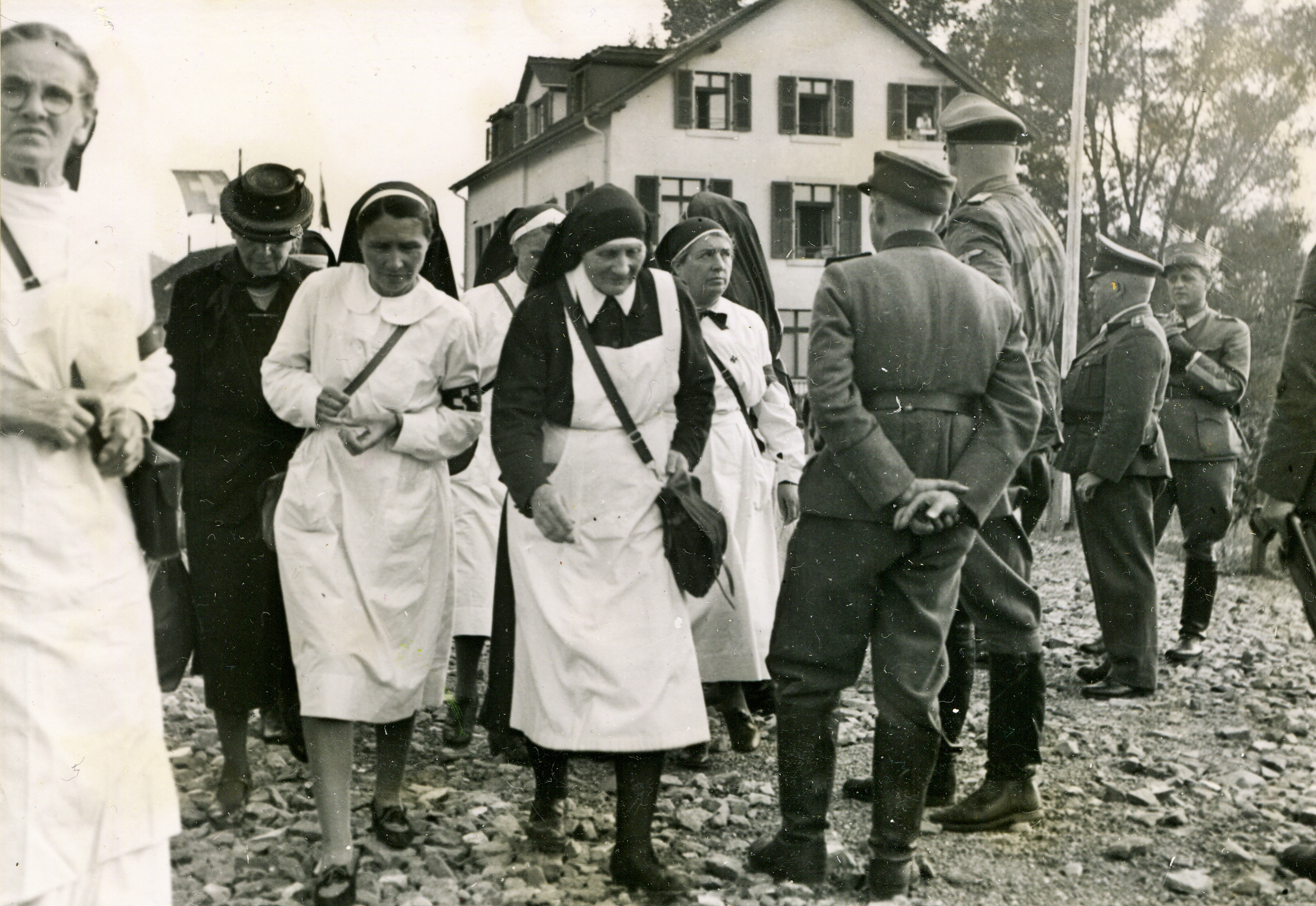
- Paravicini (center)
- Born: Maria Mathilde Paravicini; 9 June 1875; Basel, Switzerland
- Died: 10 June 1954 (aged 79); Basel, Switzerland
- Occupations: Nurse, dressmaker, refugee helper, political activist, philanthropist
- Relatives: Paravicini family

Maria Mathilde Paravicini colloquially Mathilde Paravicini (Swiss Standard German pronunciation: [ˈb̥rɑʋət͡si]; 9 June 1875 – 10 June 1954) was a Swiss nurse, refugee helper, politicial activist and philanthropist who organized the children’s trains (Kinderzüge).

== Early life and education ==
Paravicini was born 9 June 1875 in Basel, Switzerland, the youngest of five daughters, to Emanuel Leonhard Paravicini (1839–1896), an iron merchant and manufacturer, and Sophia Elisabeth "Elise" Paravicini (née Heusler; 1844–1915), into an affluent Protestant family.

The Paravicini family were originally religious refugees who escaped to Basel before the Valtellina massacre in 1620. Over the generations the family intermarried into the old stock of Basel and became part of the Daig, the city's patriciate which dates back to the 16th century. The family business, an iron trading house founded in 1773, was managed by her father in the third generation and made the family affluent. They also owned and operated a ironworks in Lucelle in Alsace, France. In 1883, the family lost the iron monopole, due to the bankruptcy of her father.

Due to the bankruptcy, the family lost large parts of their fortune, which had them to adapt to more modest means. Hence, Paravicini had his daughters to complete vocational training and pursue a trade. After school, Paravicini spent a year in Neuchâtel to improve her French and then moved to Paris, where she completed a multi-year apprenticeship as a dressmaker.

== Career ==
Back in Basel, she opened a tailoring workshop offering sewing courses, which she ran from 1898 to 1948, alongside her growing humanitarian work.

=== First World War ===
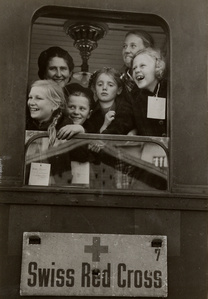
Austrian children departing from Vienna (after 1945)

During the First World War, she gained international recognition for her charitable activities related to the transport of around half a million wounded soldiers and evacuees from occupied France. Neutral Switzerland served as a transit country where returning soldiers and civilians from Germany, France, the United States, Czechoslovakia, and Poland were provided with food, clothing, and medical care at the border stations of Schaffhausen, Basel, and Geneva before quickly continuing their journey. Paravicini worked on prisoner-of-war exchanges, in the Basel relief office for war hostages, and on the organizing committee for evacuation trains, assisting refugee women, children, and the elderly in Schaffhausen and Basel.

In 1916 she co-founded and became the first president of the Association for Women's Suffrage in Basel and Surroundings. The vice president was Georgine Gerhard, founder of the Basel section of the Swiss Relief Organization for Emigrant Children (SHEK).

In the summer of 1917 she organized children’s trains for children of Swiss expatriates in Germany, personally accompanying the journeys. The association Swiss Relief, Holiday Action for Swiss Children Abroad (later the Foundation for Young Swiss Abroad) sought host families and funding. Children suffering from tuberculosis were accommodated in mountain sanatoriums.

After the war, she continued the program with the foundation Pro Juventute, arranging annual holidays for thousands of expatriate Swiss children. During the famine in Vienna, about twenty aid organizations were founded in Switzerland; in 1920 they were coordinated by the newly established umbrella organization Union internationale de secours aux enfants (UISE) under the patronage of the ICRC. The Swiss Central Committee for Destitute Foreign Children developed the criteria for these children’s trains.

=== Great Depression ===
During the Great Depression, the workers’ relief organization led by Regina Kägi-Fuchsmann (later the Swiss Workers’ Relief SAH) collaborated with the SHEK, founded in 1933 by Nettie Sutro-Katzenstein. From 1934 to 1939, Paravicini was responsible for organizing the children’s trains from Paris. In 1939 she helped establish the Swiss Women's Auxiliary Service (FHD).

=== Second World War ===
During the Second World War, Paravicini coordinated, in cooperation with the Swiss Working Group for War-Damaged Children (SAK) and later the Children’s relief of the Swiss Red Cross, the transport of about 65,000 war-affected French children between 1940 and 1945. She was the only Swiss citizen granted permission to cross the Demarcation Line into occupied Paris to collect children from northern France and Bordeaux.

In Basel, she assisted Georgine Gerhard in the activities of the local SHEK section, supported by her extended family. Her nephew, Chief Physician Anton Christ, treated the children free of charge at the SHEK home “Waldeck” in Langenbruck.

When the children’s trains were halted in late 1942, she continued her humanitarian work in the railway station center of the Friends of Young Women (FJM), serving as its president from 1921 until her death. During the war, the FJM “Stübli” (lounge) on the first floor of Basel station became a key hub of refugee assistance.

== Later life and death ==
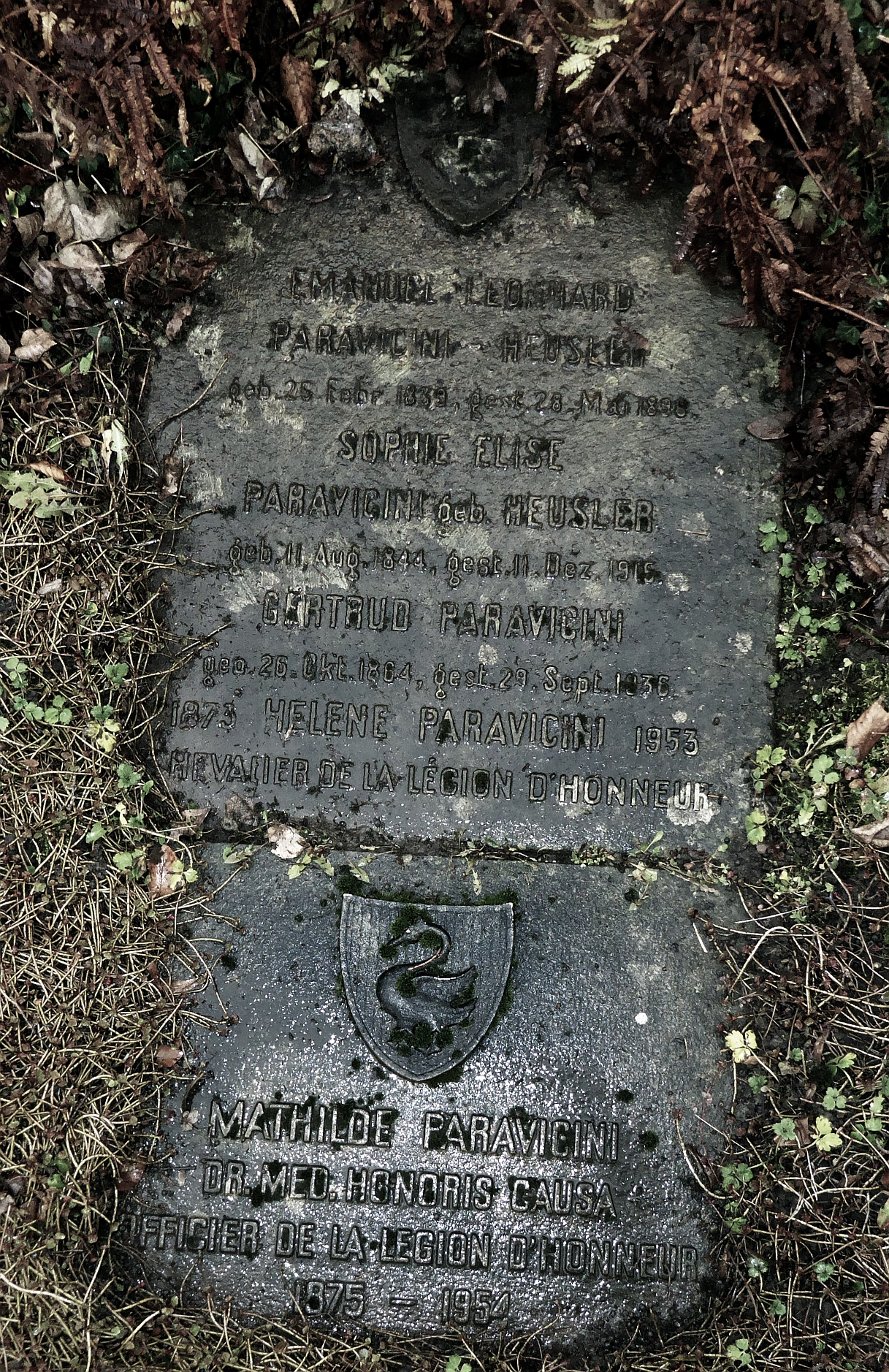
Family grave of Mathilde Paravicini (1875–1954) at Wolfgottesacker Cemetery, Basel

After the war, she organized children’s trains across Europe for the Swiss Donation, tirelessly accompanying and caring for children in the rough third-class carriages. Paravicini died in 1954 at the age of 79.

== Honours ==
- On 2 September 1919, she and her sister Helene were awarded the rank of Chevalier of the French Legion of Honour in Basel for their role in the repatriation of evacuated French citizens.
- On 2 February 1922, the “French Monument” by sculptor Paul Landowski was inaugurated on Promenadenstieg in Schaffhausen to commemorate the evacuation and care of French civilians during the First World War.
- In 1942, she became the first woman to receive an honorary doctorate from the University of Basel’s Faculty of Medicine.
- In 1946, the French government promoted her to Officier of the Legion of Honour.
- On 27 June 1948, the Monument of Gratitude “The Mother Figure” by French sculptor Georges Salendres (1890–1985) was unveiled to the sound of the Marseillaise as France’s tribute to the women of the Swiss Red Cross who cared for many French children.
- In 1964, the city of Basel named a street in the Gellert district (St. Alban quarter) after her, the first time a woman received such an honor.
- From 2 April to 31 May 2014, the University of Basel hosted the exhibition Forgotten Basel Woman – Mathilde Paravicini.

== Bibliography ==
- Mathilde Paravicini: Kinder kommen in die Schweiz. In: Eugen Theodor Rimli (ed.): Das Buch vom Roten Kreuz. Das Rote Kreuz von den Anfängen bis heute. Fraumünster-Verlag, Zürich 1944, pp. 336–367.
- Helene Vischer: Dr. h. c. Mathilde Paravicini. In: Basler Jahrbuch. 1955, pp. 196–200.
- Mathilde Paravicini 1875–1954. Obituary on the occasion of her burial on 15 June 1954.
- Helena Kanyar Becker: Pionierin der Kinderzüge. Mathilde Paravicini (1875–1954). In: idem (ed.): Vergessene Frauen. Humanitäre Kinderhilfe und offizielle Flüchtlingspolitik 1917–1948 (=Basler Beiträge zur Geschichtswissenschaft Vol. 182). Schwabe, Basel 2010, ISBN 978-3-7965-2695-4, pp. 18–40.
- Salome Lienert: Wir wollen helfen, da wo Not ist. Das Schweizer Hilfswerk für Emigrantenkinder 1933–1947. Chronos, Zürich 2013, ISBN 978-3-0340-1157-0.
- Helena Kanyar Becker (ed.): Pionierin der Kinderzüge : Erinnerungen an Mathilde Paravicini (1875–1954). Schwabe, Basel 2017, ISBN 978-3-7965-3731-8.
