= Elkington & Co. =

English silver manufacturer in Birmingham

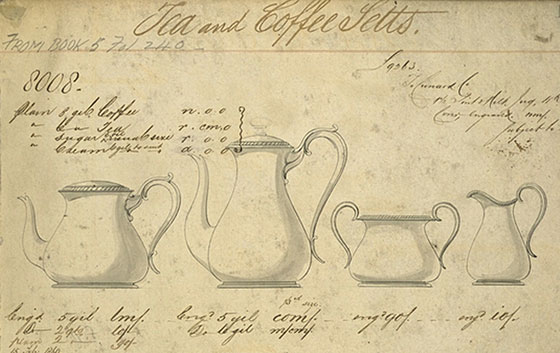
Elkington & Co., design for a tea and coffee set (1860)

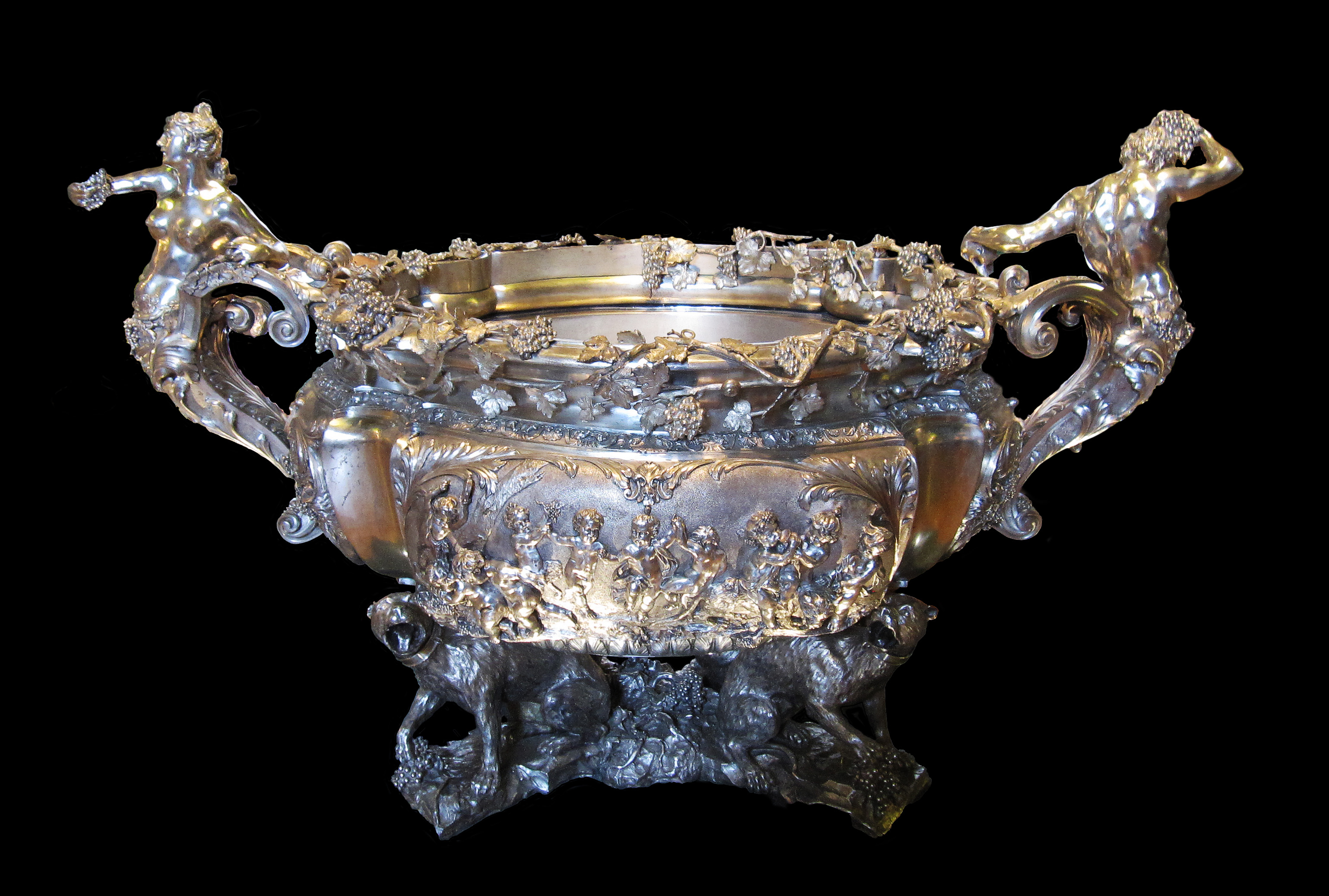
Electrotype copy of the Jerningham wine cooler done by Elkington & Co. in 1884. The original is in The Hermitage in St. Petersburg; the electrotype is in the Victoria & Albert Museum in London

Elkington & Co. was a silver manufacturer from Birmingham, England.

== History ==
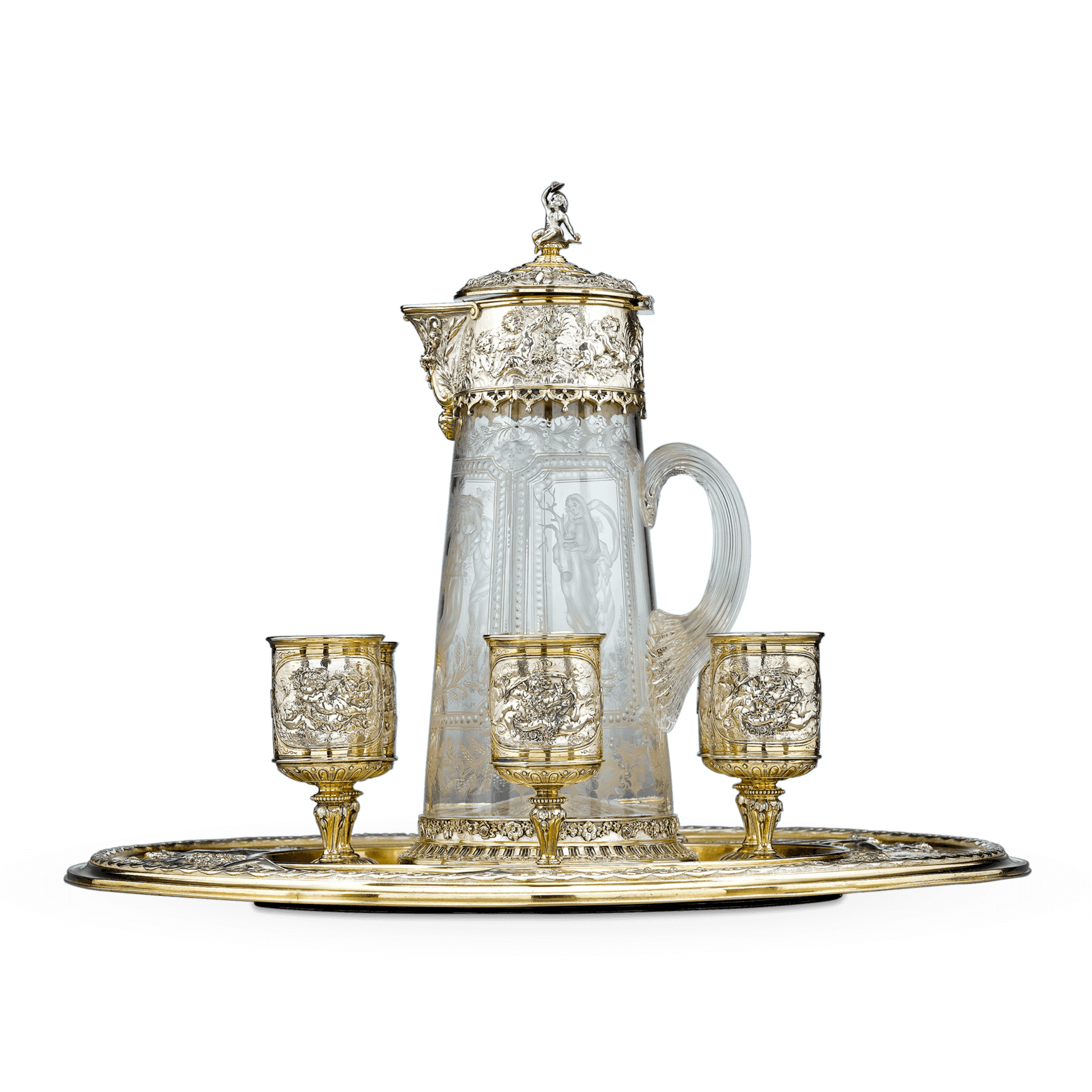
Elkington Beverage Service, c. 1870.

It was founded by George Richards Elkington and his cousin, Henry Elkington, in the 1830s. It operated under the name G. R. Elkington & Co. until 1842, when a third partner, Josiah Mason, joined the firm. It operated as Elkington, Mason, & Co. until 1861, when the partnership with Mason was terminated. The firm operated independently as Elkington & Co. from 1861 until 1963. It was then taken over by British Silverware, Ltd.. In 1971 British Silverware, Ltd. became a subsidiary of Delta Metal Co. Ltd.

Over the course of history it became very successful and was one of the prime producers of silver plating. Elkington received various royal warrants of appointments, and also an Imperial and Royal Warrant of Appointment from the emperor of Austria. Their most famous pieces are the electrotype copy of the Jerningham Wine Cooler, at the Victoria & Albert Museum in London and the Venus Rosewater Dish at Wimbledon Championships.

Recently Yardley Tennis Club has discovered that their oldest Presidential Challenge Cup was also made by Elkington & co and still in use today over 100 years later.
