= Isaac Briot =

French engraver

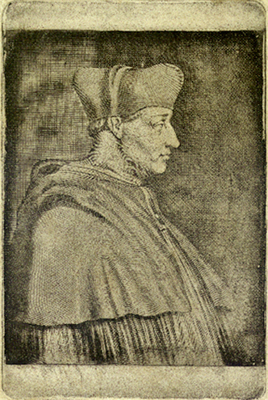
Georges d'Amboise, heliography from 1826 by Nicéphore Niépce from the engraving by Briot from 1633.

Isaac Briot (1585–1670) a French engraver and draughtsman, was born in 1585, and died in Paris in 1670. His plates are rather neatly executed, in the style of Wierix, and mostly from his own compositions.

== Portraits ==
- Cardinal de Richelieu.
- Cardinal d'Amboise, archbishop of Rouen. (pictured)
- Gaspard, Comte de Coligny.
- The poet François Malherbe, in 4to.
- The poet Marini, in 4to.

== Other subjects ==
- The Alliance of France with Spain.
- St. John the Baptist in the Desert.
- St. Peter weeping.
- L'Oraison dominicale expliquee par des emblèmes. Two small plates.
- The Virtues. Seven small plates.
- The Sibyls. A set of small circular plates.
- Ovid's 'Metamorphoses.' A set of plates published 1637.

Marie Briot, daughter of Isaac, with her father, executed plates after Paul de La Barre, J. B. Coriolan, St. Igny, and others.
