= Johann Joachim Kändler =

German sculptor (1706–1775)

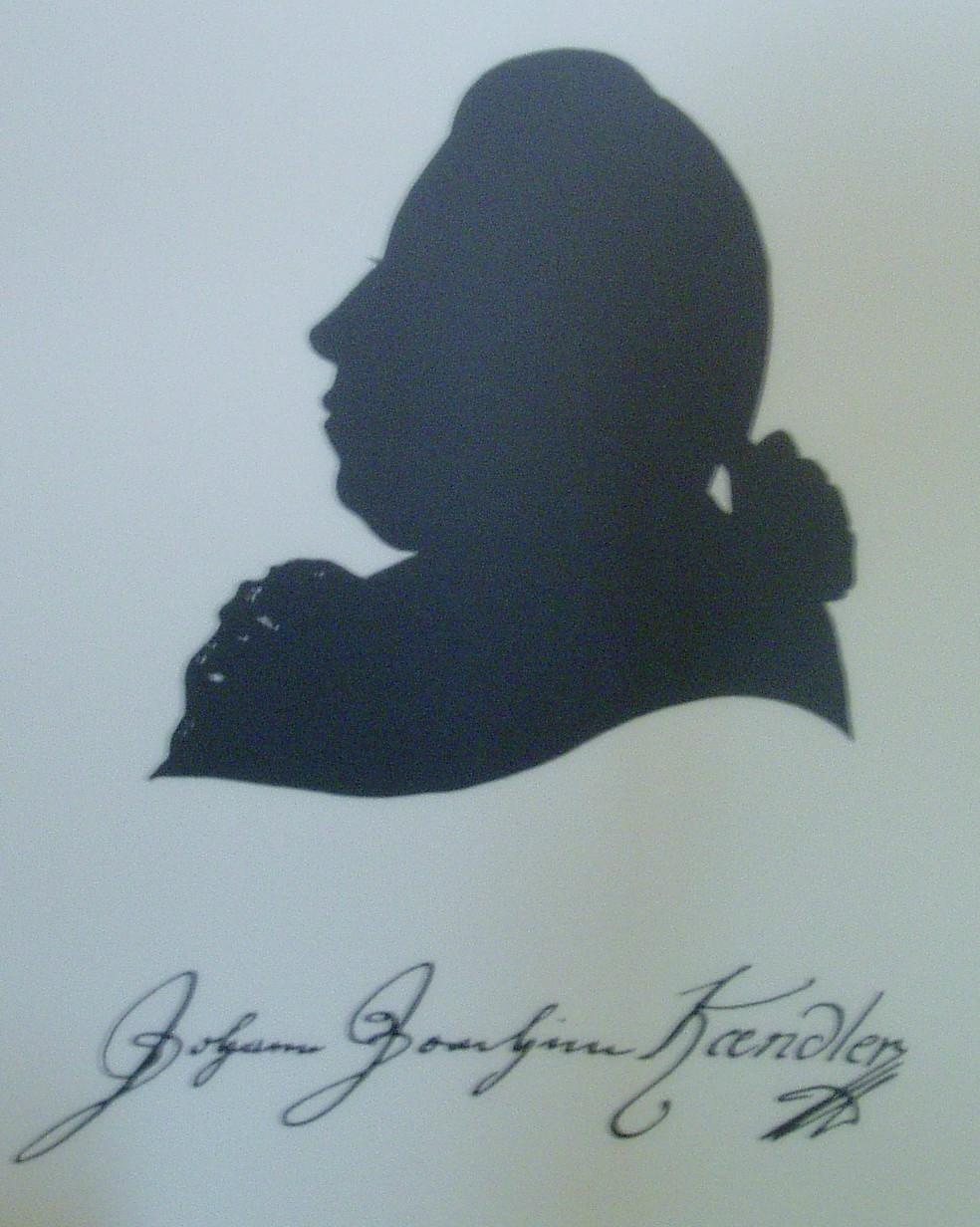
Johann Joachim Kändler

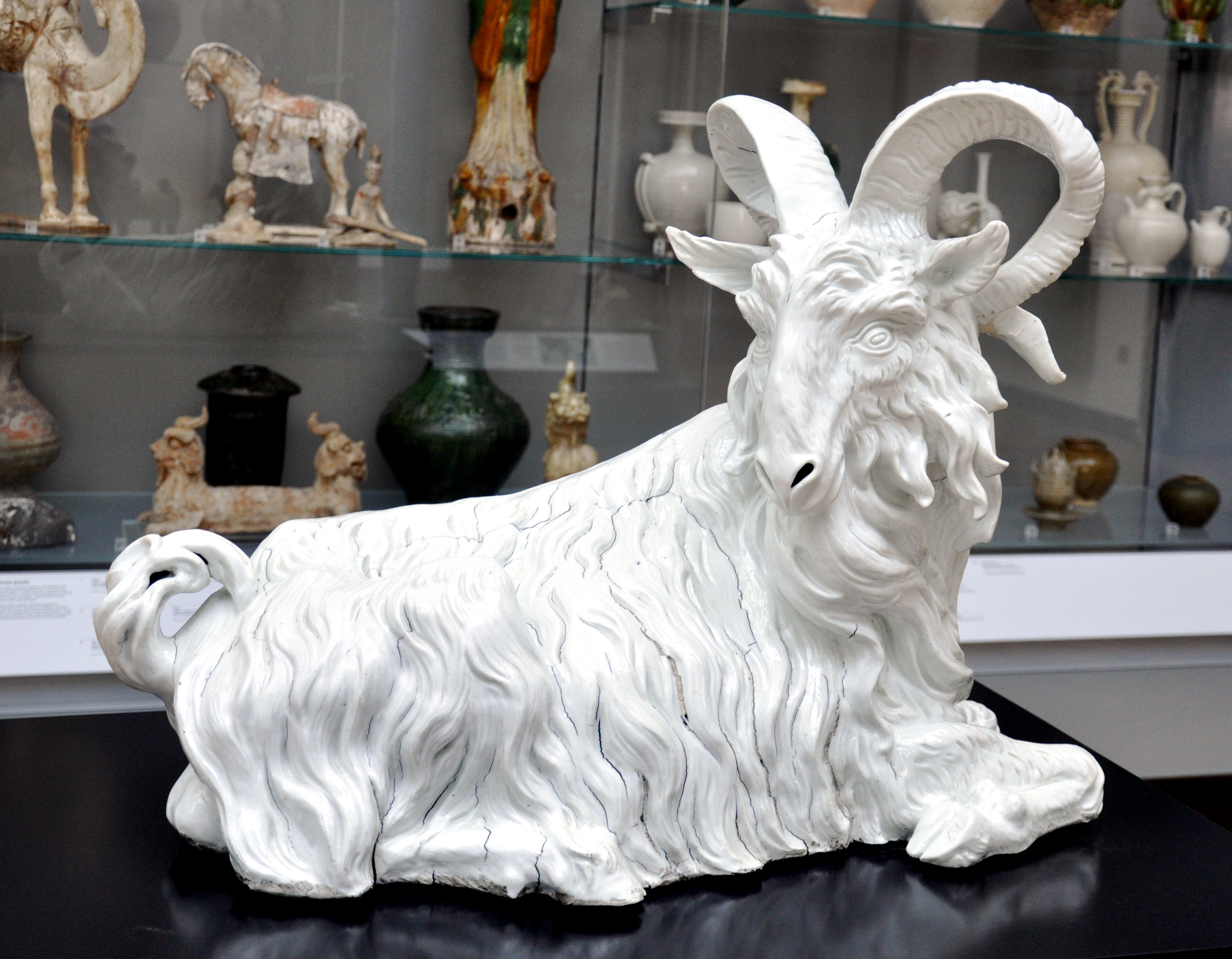
Goat, one of the large animal figures for the Japanese Palace in Dresden

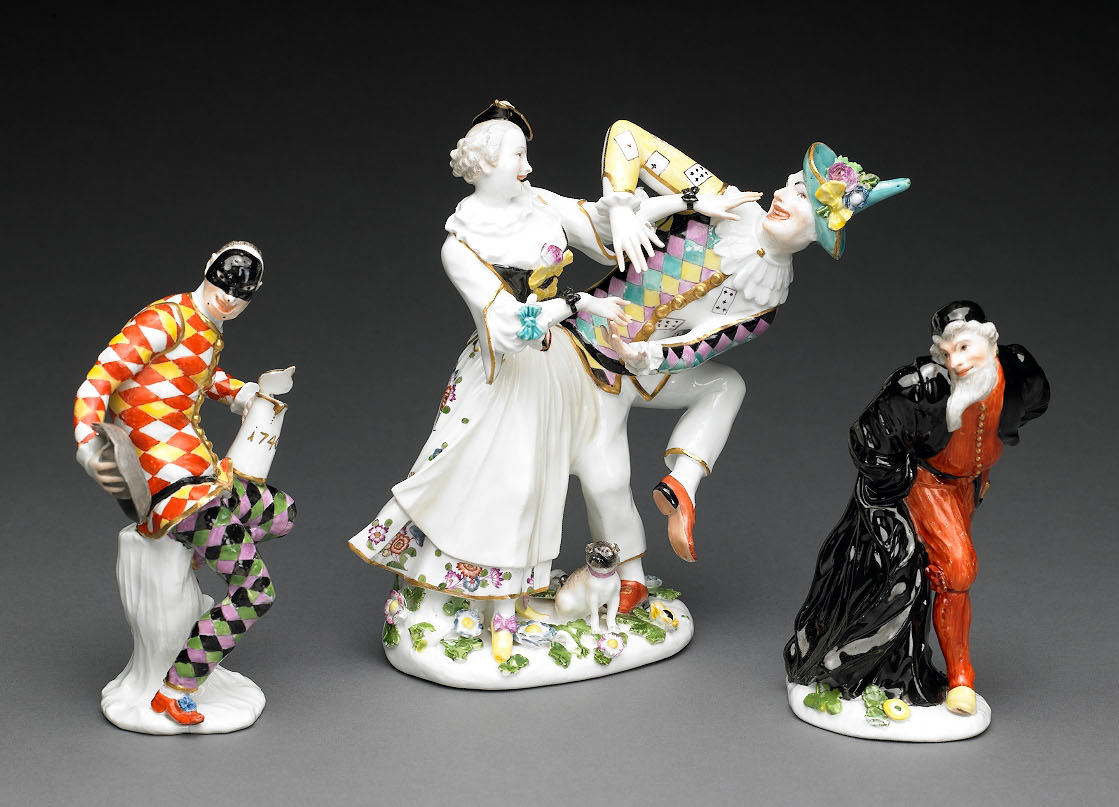
Commedia dell'arte figurines, c. 1736-1744

Johann Joachim Kändler (June 15, 1706 – May 18, 1775) was a German sculptor who became the most important modeller of Meissen porcelain, and perhaps of all European porcelain. He worked at Meissen from 1731 until his death in 1775.

Meissen pieces of all sorts were normally made with moulds mostly designed by Kändler, who also supervised the production of the moulds and checked the quality of the end products. He was often not involved with painting the pieces, a task that could vary among various examples.

In addition to his work as Meissen's master modeller, Kändler also serve in other roles at the factory. First as chief of sculptural shaping, and later as an arcanist, he led the porcelain production effort through the restless period of the Seven Years' War against great odds.

== Life ==
Kändler was born in Fischbach near Arnsdorf, Germany, the son of a pastor. He received a classical education and developed an excellent knowledge of Greco-Roman mythology. This knowledge, great skill with his hands and an exceptional gift for observation laid the foundations for Kändler's later career. The profits from his porcelain work rose in tandem with his social status. Despite owning several properties and his own vineyard, he died in a great deal of debt. He was interred at St Afra's Abby, Meissen.

== Work ==
Kändler's professional life began as an apprentice under the important Dresden court sculptor and altar carver Johann Benjamin Thomae (1682–1751). Already at this time, he showed much skill and was assigned important tasks. On 22 June 1731 at the age of 25, he was appointed court sculptor by Augustus II and installed as a modeller at the Meissen porcelain factory. At Meissen, he became an assistant to Johann Jacob Kirchner, and succeeded him as the master modeller in 1733 when Kirchner resigned. His early porcelain animal groups combine a forceful impression of nature with the influence of Dresden sculpture. Later, Kändler was in charge of sculptural shaping and finally became an arcanist, admitted to the secrets of the formula for porcelain. The summit of his career was his appointment as court commissioner in 1749.

The fame of the Meissen factory was based on the porcelain completed under Kändler's technical and aesthetic direction. In the Swan Service for his director, Heinrich von Brühl, also the dictatorial first minister, he developed the small scene figures that enrich the table service. In its elegant flourish and easy charm, his work shows the heavy influence of rococo.

The works that Kändler produced at Meissen substantially changed the porcelain industry. His early sculptures, which primarily drew motifs from the natural world, were celebrated for their accuracy and elegance, with a degree of pathos that contrasted with most other work of the time. His bird sculptures are especially noteworthy, such as jays with squirrels and stag beetles, orioles and woodpeckers with cockchafers. Other animal sculptures included one of Clara the rhinoceros. The Swan Service created for von Brühl, which is today considered a masterpiece of porcelain art, marked Kändler's turn to small decorative figures. Later, as Kändler became increasingly involved in court life, he took inspiration from the popular form of theatre commedia dell'arte. Together with his coworkers, he created entire groups of small accessories and figurines that took the romantic shepherd imagery of rococo and infused it with the life of commedia dell'arte characters. These figures, especially the Harlequins, lend a more evocative sense of this form of theatre than do most illustrations.

Among Kändler's thousands of works is the Monkey Band (or Monkey Orchestra), created in 1753, which he intended as a metaphorical rejection of compulsion. With this homage to the Enlightenment ideal of the free and rational human, he reflected the contemporary zeitgeist. To this day, the figure is still reproduced. A crucifixion group created by Kändler stands in the Schlosskirche Lauchhammer-West. He also produced a model of Augustus III of Poland on a horse that was intended to be a life-size statue, but the statue was never created.

The all-white figure known as Triumph of Amphitrite is the only known work that Kändler signed. He was succeeded by his assistants Johann Friedrich Eberlein and Peter Reinecke.

After 40 years of work at the factory, Kändler died in Meissen on 18 May 1775.

== Collections ==
Examples of the thousands of pieces modelled by Kändler may be seen in most major museums collecting ceramics. Perhaps the best British collection is that found on the sixth floor of the Victoria and Albert Museum in London. Other museums containing Kändler's work include the Birmingham Museum of Art, the Getty Museum, the National Gallery of Art and the Rijksmuseum. In Germany, his sculptures may be found at the Bavarian National Museum and the Dresden Porcelain Collection at Zwinger Palace.

== In popular culture ==
The plot of the first episode of the American television situation comedy Sanford and Son is based on the collection and sale of a pastoral figure attributed to Kändler. The Meissen factory, the distinctive crossed-swords trademark and Kändler's name are mentioned repeatedly throughout the episode.

The Porcelain Menagerie, a historical novel by Jillian Forsberg, features Johann Kändler as a central character, depicting his work creating a porcelain menagerie under Augustus II the Strong.

“The Convenient Marriage” by Georgette Heyer mentions in chapter four a Dresden harlequin. The Earl says, “If you bought that for a Kändler, my love, I am much afraid you have been imposed upon.”

== Gallery ==
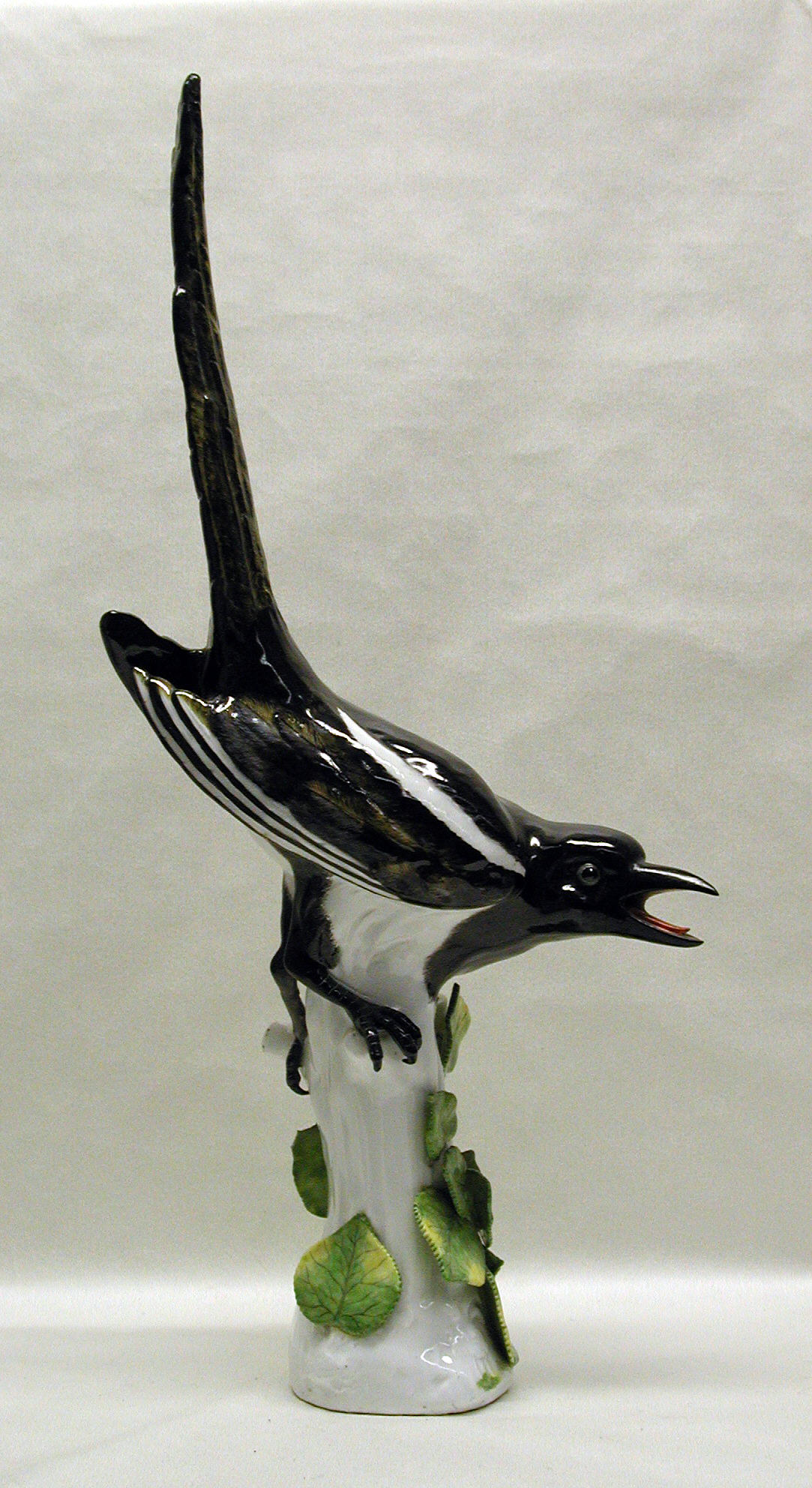
Magpie (one of a pair)

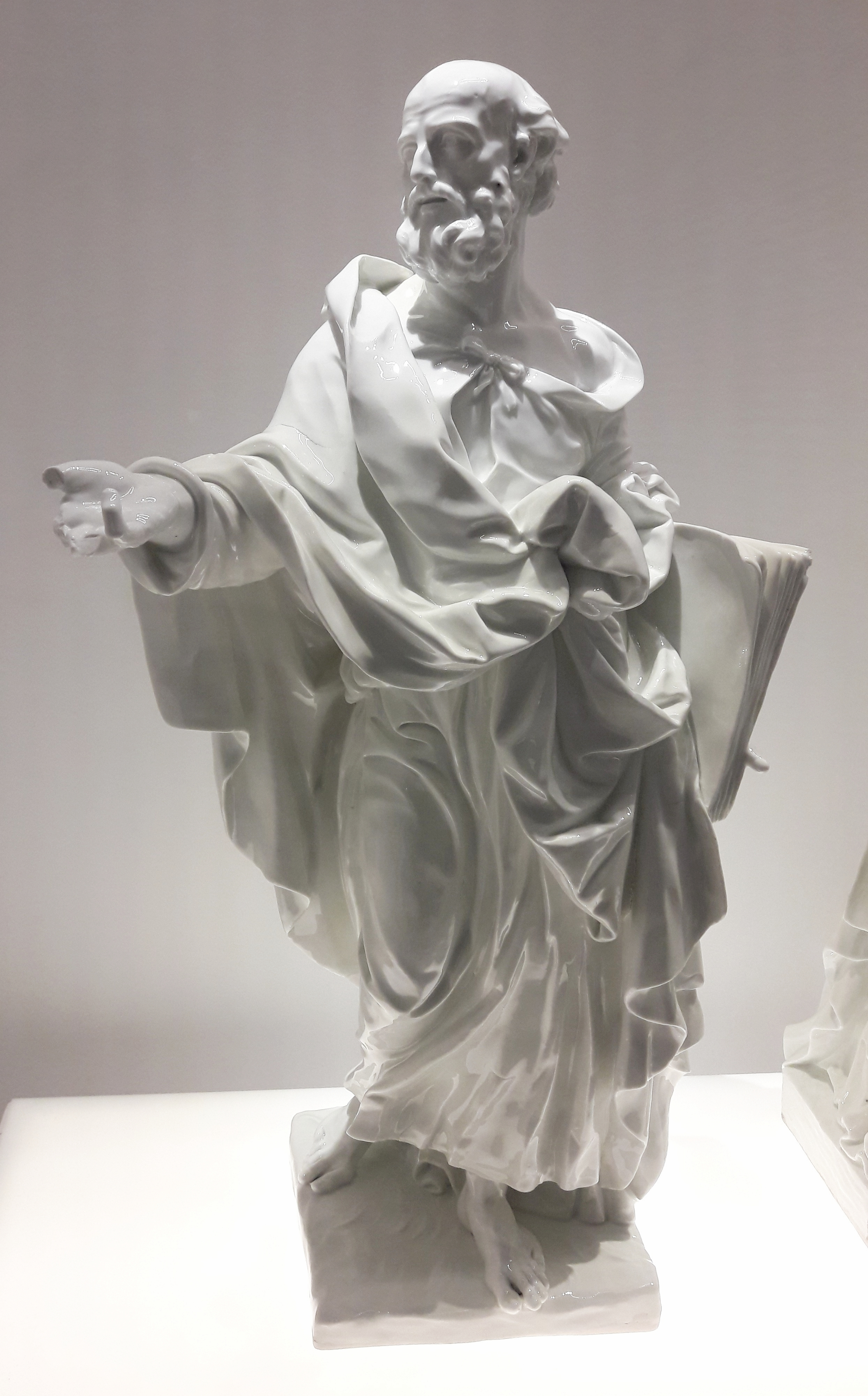
Saint Peter, 1733–35

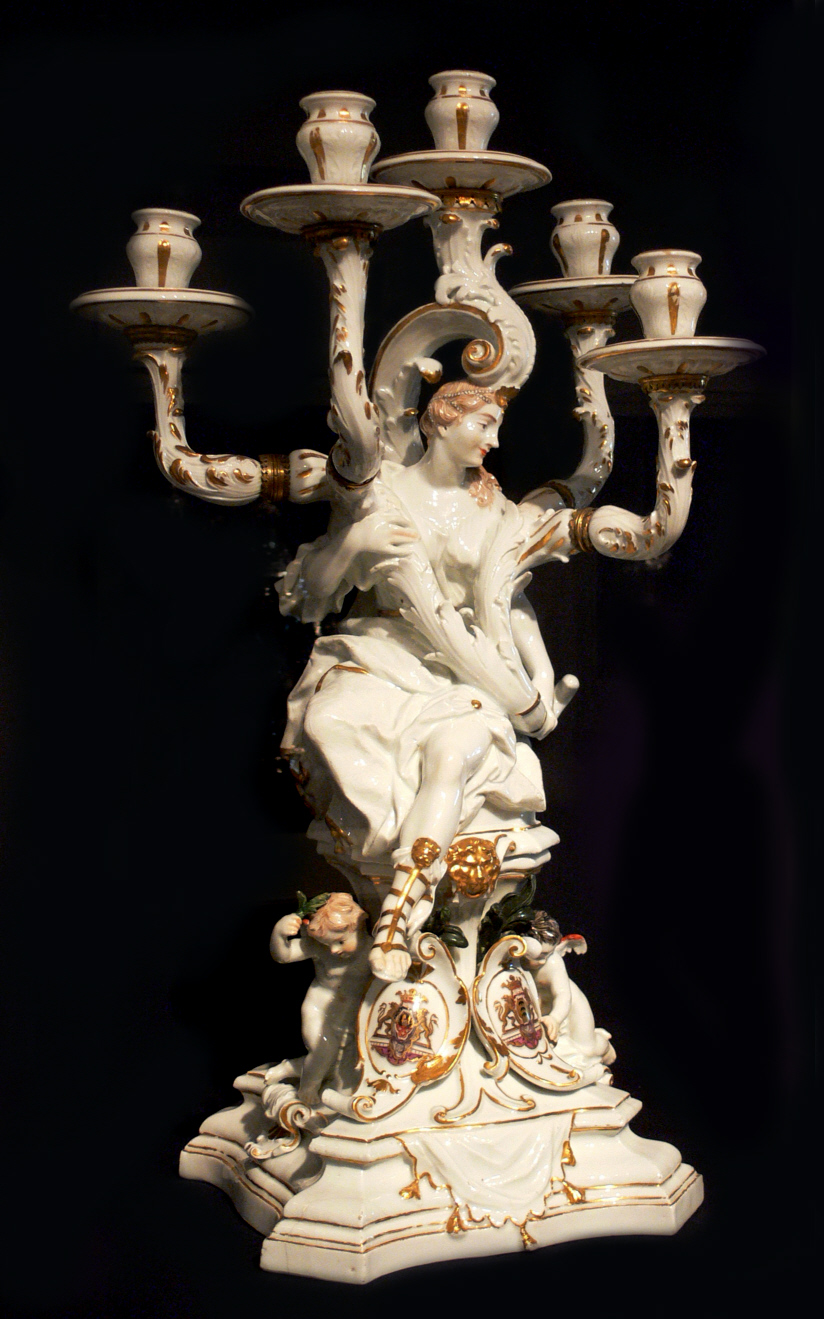
Candelabrum from the Sulkowsky service, 1736, Dallas Museum of Art

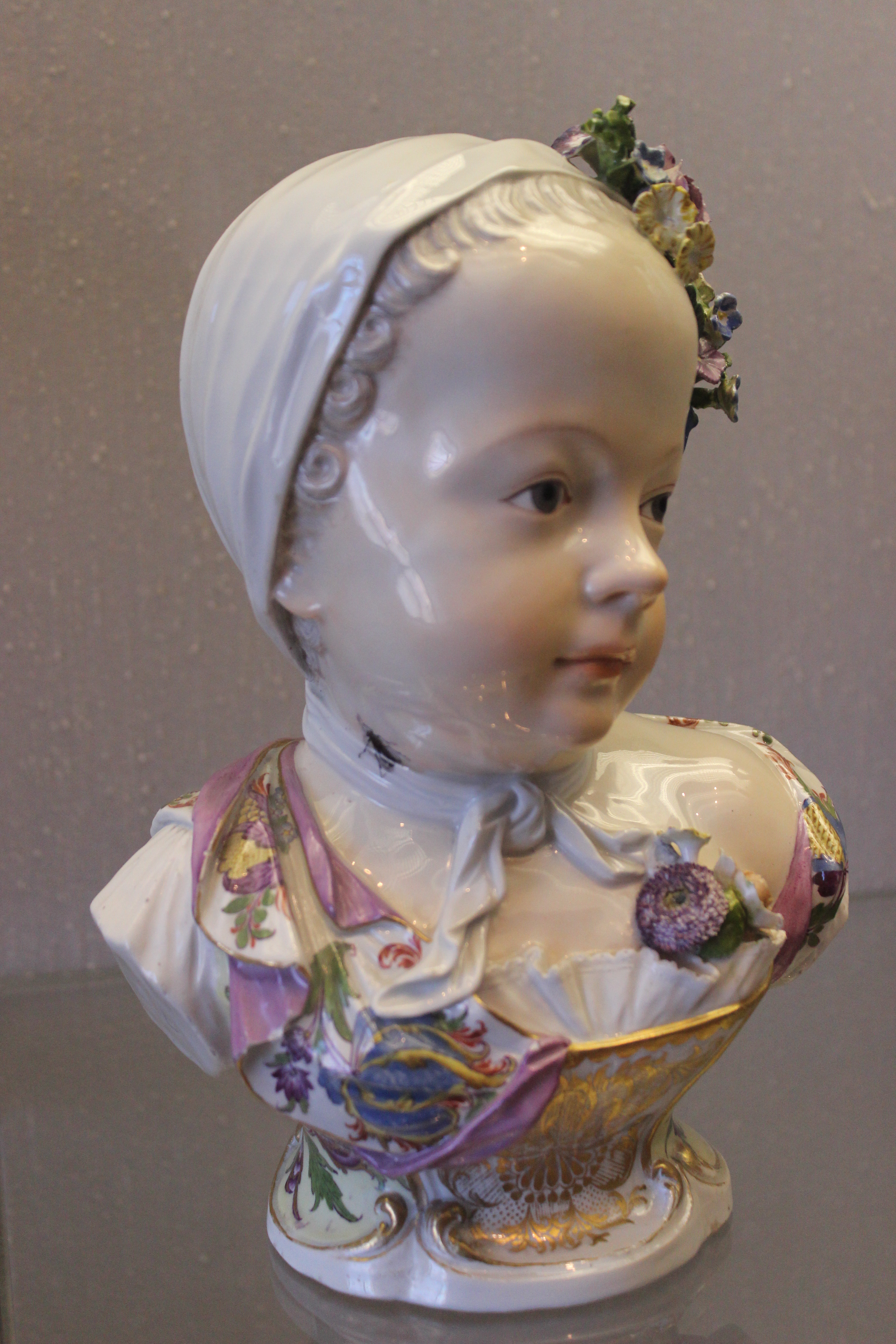
Portrait bust of Princess Marie Zéphyrine, d. 1755

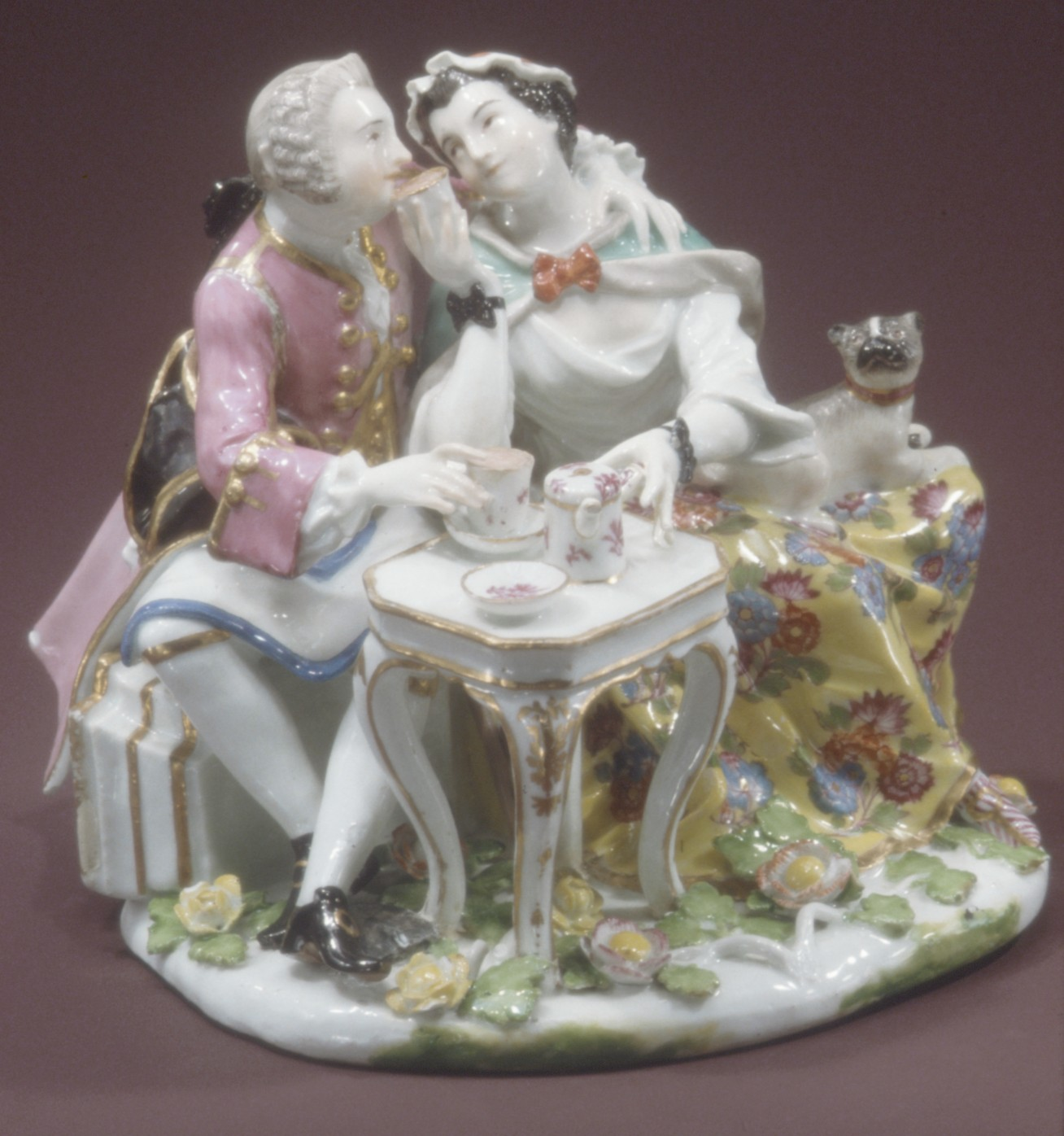
Couple Drinking Chocolate, c. 1744

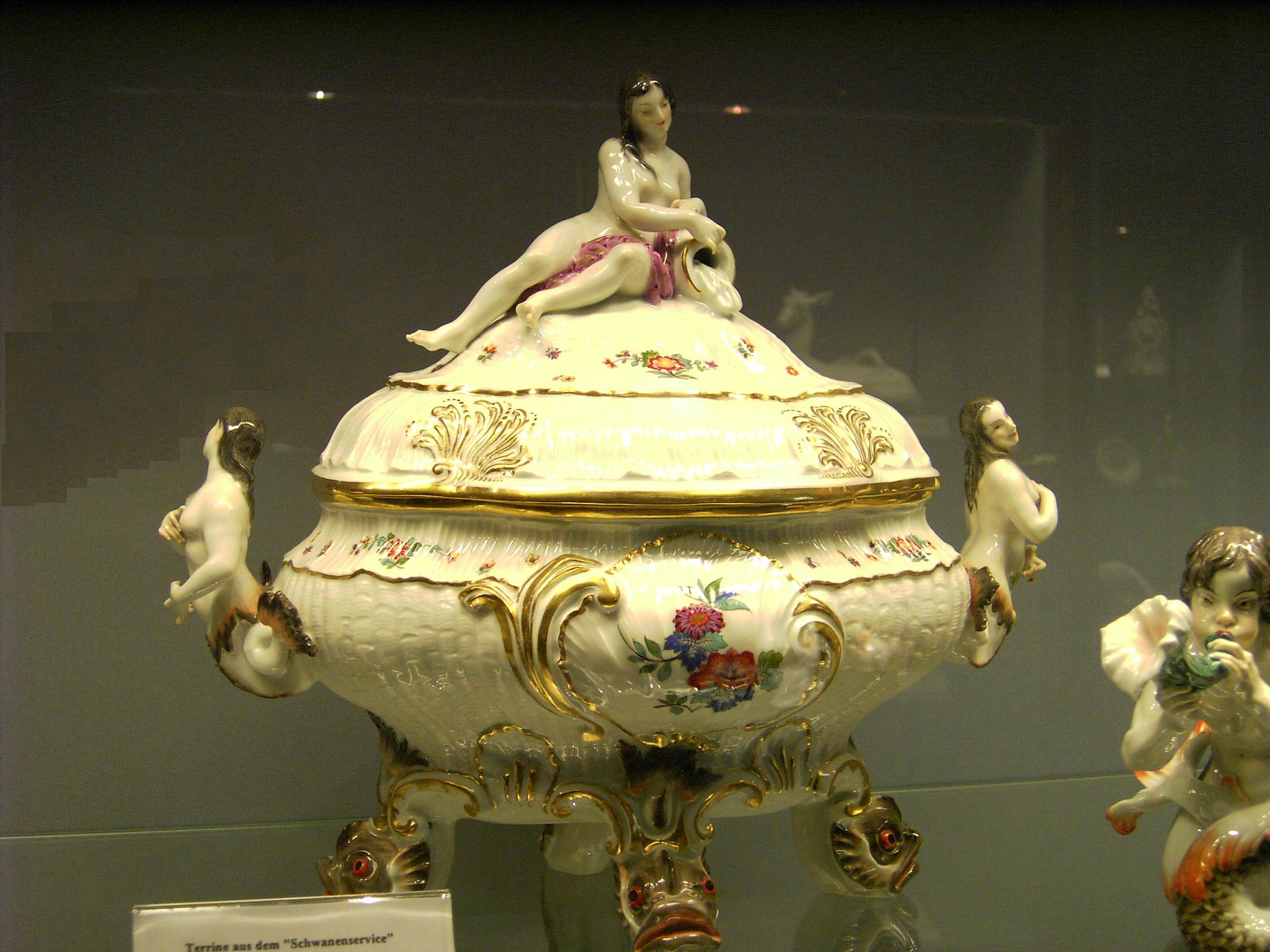
Tureen of the Swan Service

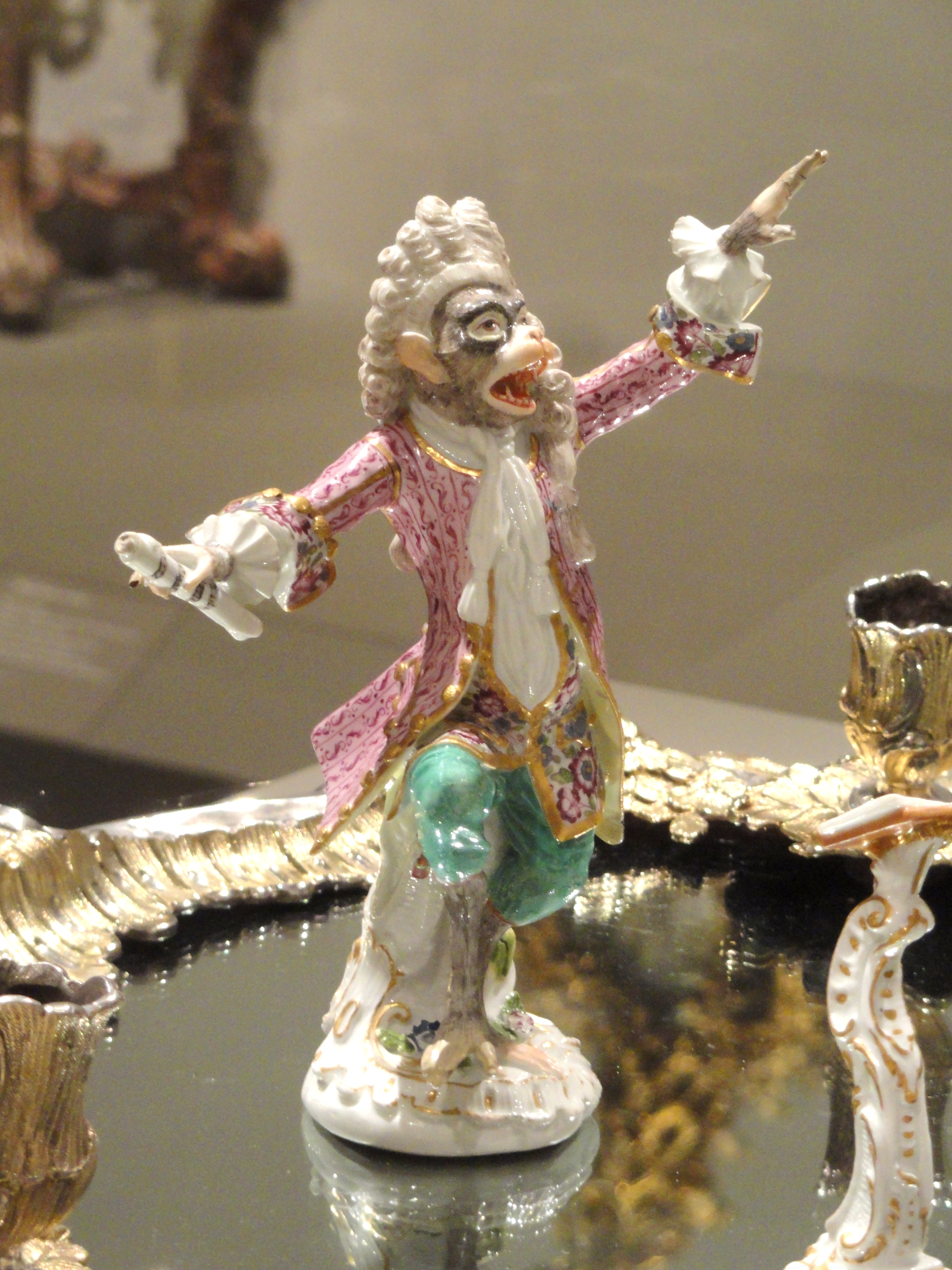
Figure from the Monkey Band, c. 1765
