= Boulard =

Boulard is a surname. Notable people with the surname include:

- Auguste Boulard (1825–1897), French painter
- Auguste Laurent Boulard (1852–1927), French painter and engraver
- Garry Boulard (born 1953), American reporter and author
- Hubert Boulard (1971–2020), French comics writer and colorist
- Jean-Claude Boulard (1943–2018), French politician
- Martin Silvestre Boulard (1748–1809), French printer-bookseller
