= Louis Marie Lemaire =

French painter (1824–1910)

Louis Lemaire
- Born: Louis Marie Lemaire; April 18, 1824; Paris, France
- Died: March 16, 1910 (aged 85); Paris, France
- Known for: Painting

Louis Lemaire (April 18, 1824 – March 16, 1910) was a French painter, engraver, and wallpaper designer.

== Early life ==
Louis Marie Lemaire was born on April 18, 1824, in Paris, France.

== Career ==
Lemaire made his debut at the Salon of 1849, the exhibition run by the Académie des Beaux-Arts.

Following his training in drawing and painting, Lemaire worked in a wallpaper factory and produced highly successful floral designs. He designed a wallpaper that was produced by Zuber & Cie, based in Rixheim, in 1856. In 1861, he redirected his career toward landscape painting, leaving his previous occupation behind. He trained as a painter under the guidance of artists connected with the Barbizon School of landscape painting, among them Jules Dupré and Auguste Boulard. Lemaire was introduced to the Oise Valley through Auguste Boulard, who resided in Champagne-sur-Oise during the summer. He went to L'Isle-Adam, Val-d'Oise, in 1862 and then settled in the neighboring town of Parmain. He resided in the villa "Les Arcades" on rue du Maréchal Foch.

By the 1880s, Pauline Caspers of Paris became one of his distinguished pupils.

For many years, his work, particularly landscapes and floral still lifes, appeared at the Paris Salon. In 1883, he earned an honorary mention at the Salon of French Artists (Salon des artistes français). His painting Peony Bed (Massif de pivoines) earned a third-class medal at the 1884 Paris Salon. At the time, he resided in Paris at 1 rue Saint-Claude. He also exhibited work at the 1889 Paris Exposition. He was awarded a second-class medal at the 1899 Salon of French Artists for his painting Peonies and Creeping Roses (Pivoines et Rosier Grimpant). He continued exhibiting at French salons until 1909.

== Death ==
Lemaire passed away in 1910, at the age of 86. He was interred at Père Lachaise Cemetery in Paris, France.

== Legacy ==
Some of his works are held in French museums, including in Compiègne and Rouen. The French town of Parmain preserves his legacy through the display of a restored floral pastel in the town hall's main staircase, originally donated by his wife. A room named in his honor, the Louis Lemaire Room, is located behind the Parmain town hall.

== Gallery ==
Selected works by Louis Lemaire

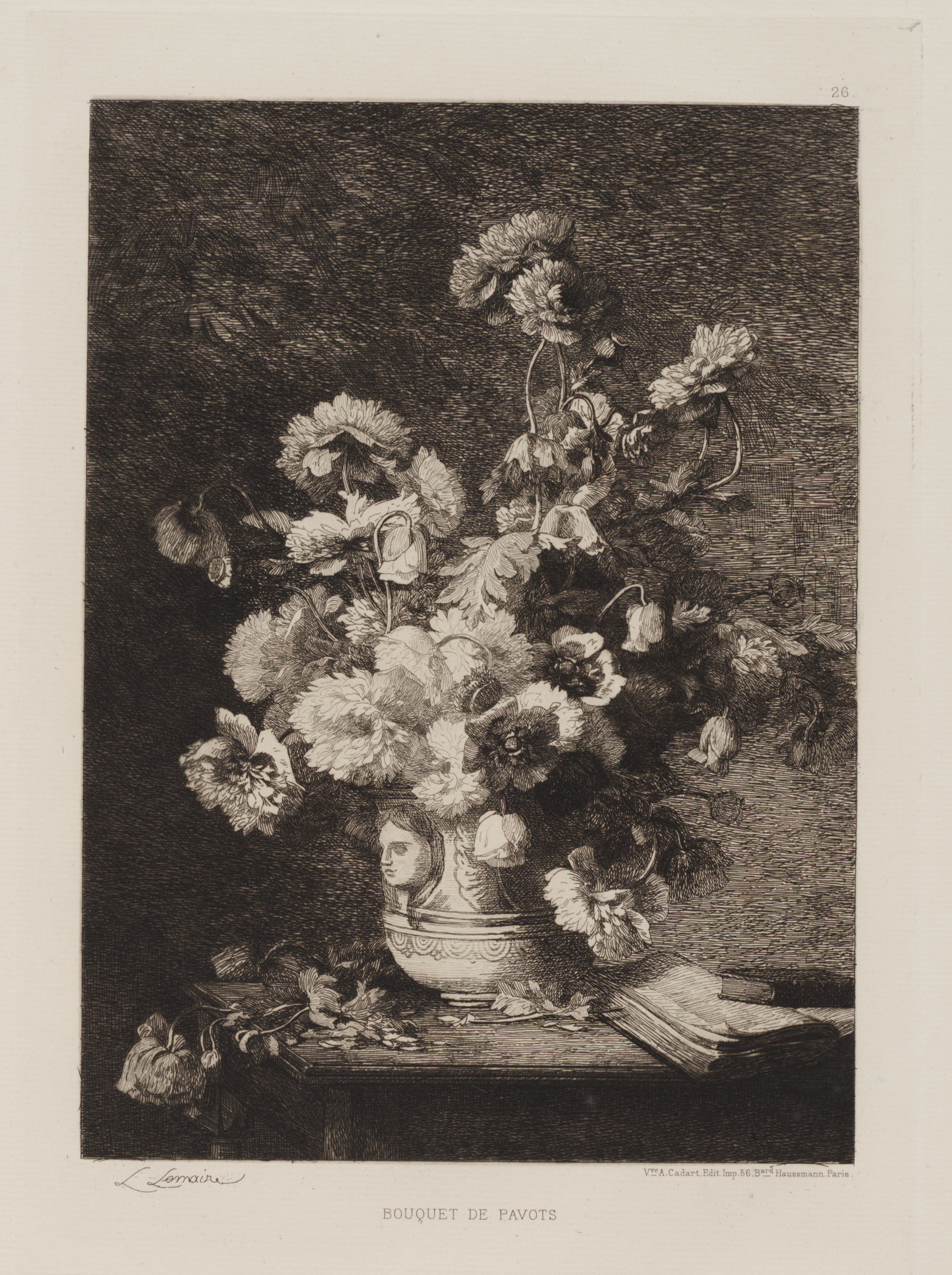
Bouquet of Poppies (Bouquet de pavots) (1879), etching, Alfred Cadart edition

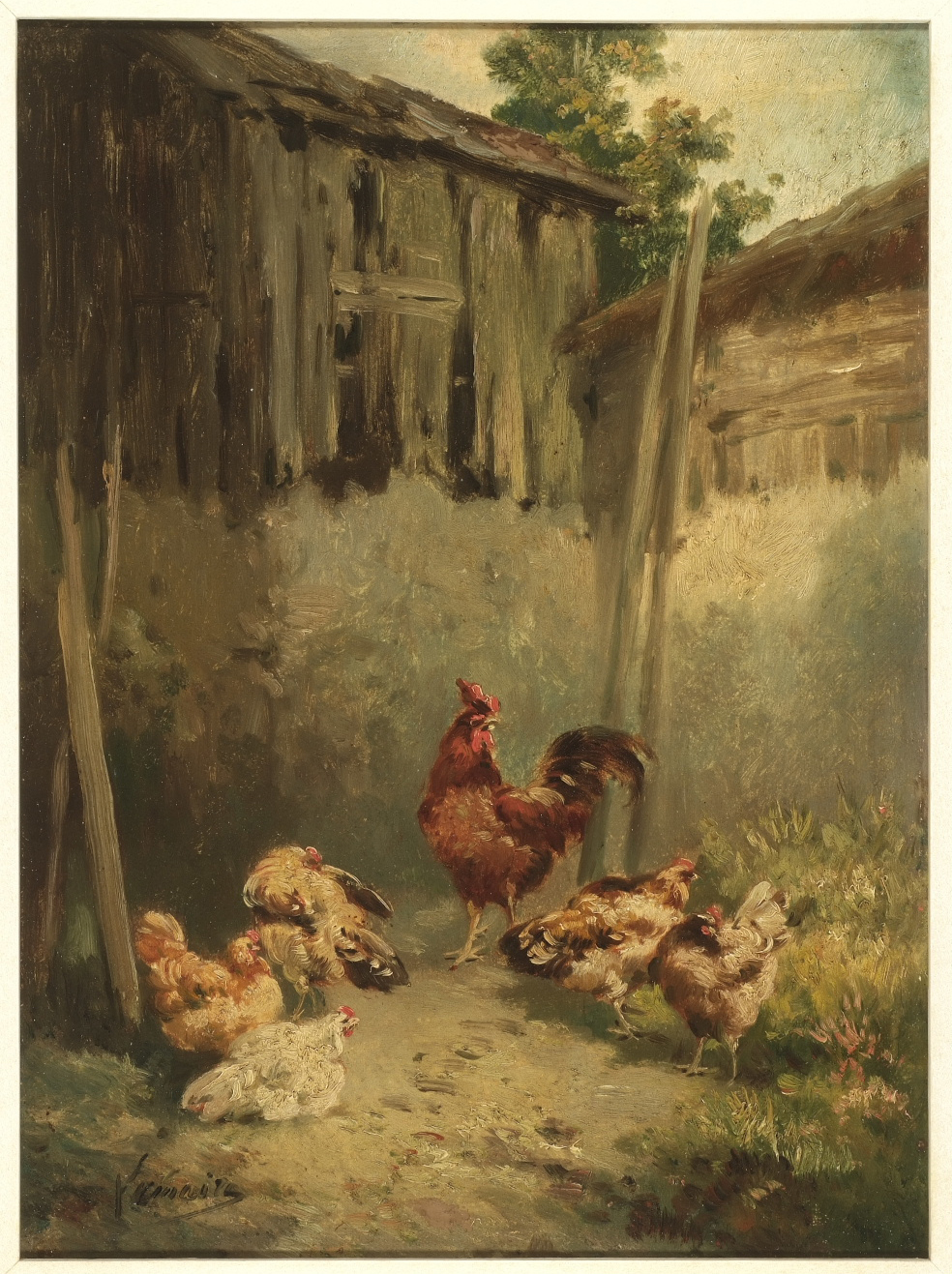
Farmyard with Chickens (Boerenerf met kippen)

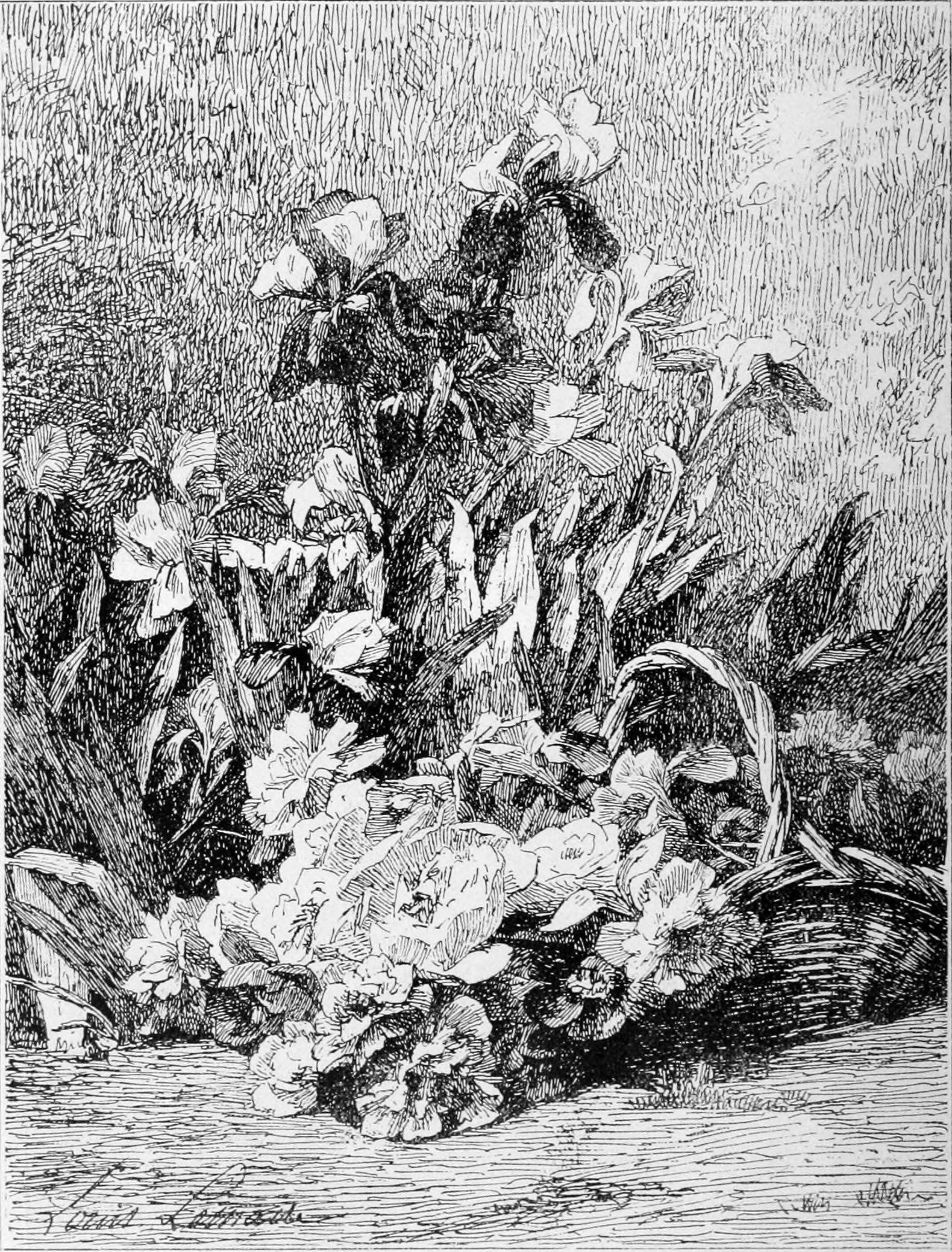
Irises and peonies (Iris et pivoines)

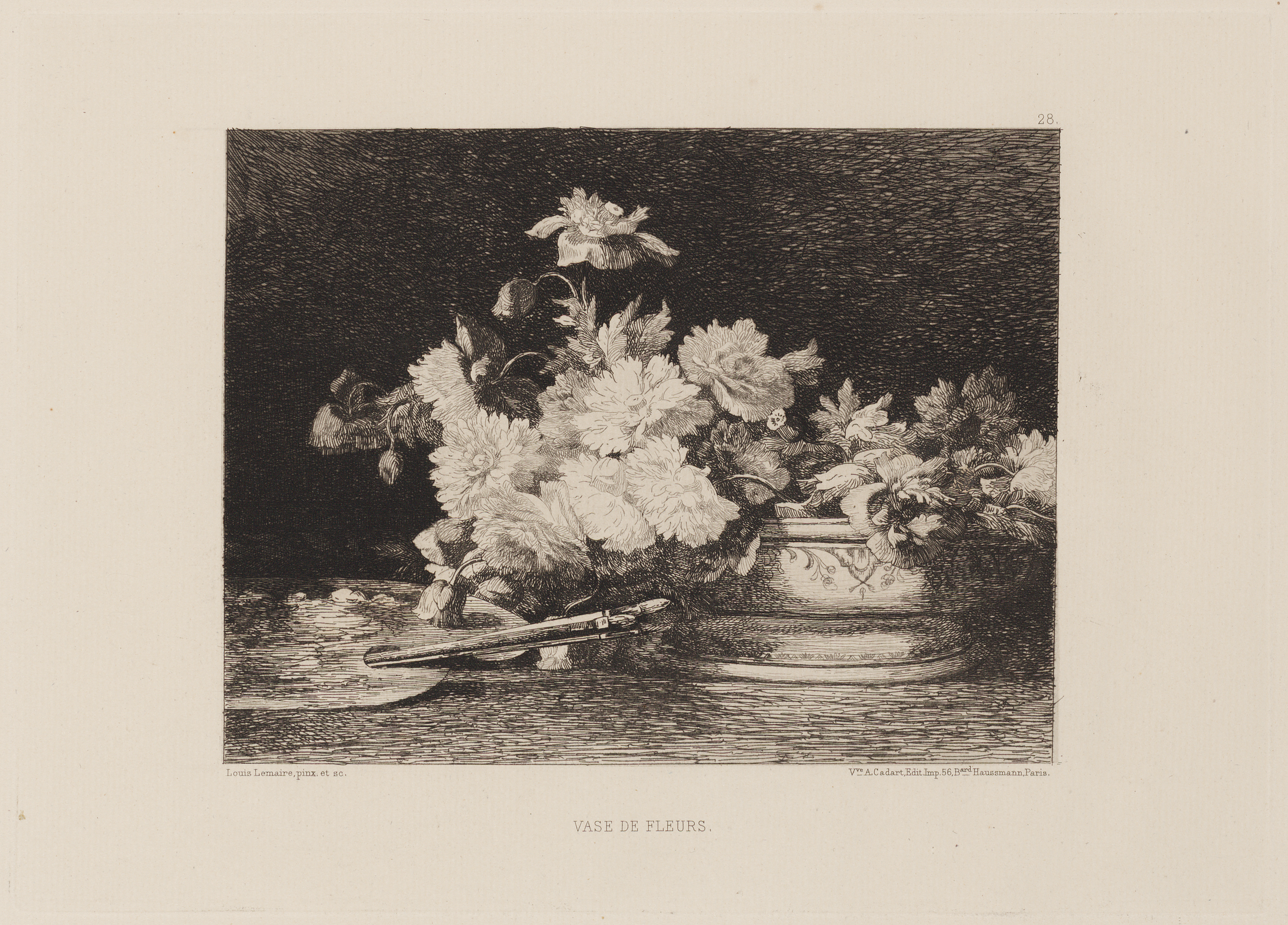
Flower Vase (Vase de fleurs)
