= Martin Silvestre Boulard =

French printer and bookseller (1748 - 1809)

Martin Silvestre Boulard (16 May 1748 in Montlouis (Cher) – 3 May 1822 in Loches) was a French printer-bookseller.

== Works ==
- 1791: Manuel de l'imprimeur
- 1791: La Vie et les aventures de Ferdinand Vertamond... under the pseudonym "M. B. I. L. et E." = "Martin Boulard, imprimeur, libraire et éditeur".
- 1793: Considérations importantes sur la déchéance du Roi, et les circonstances actuelles
- 1804: Traité élémentaire de Bibliographie.
