= Auguste Boulard (painter, born 1825) =

French painter (1825–1897)

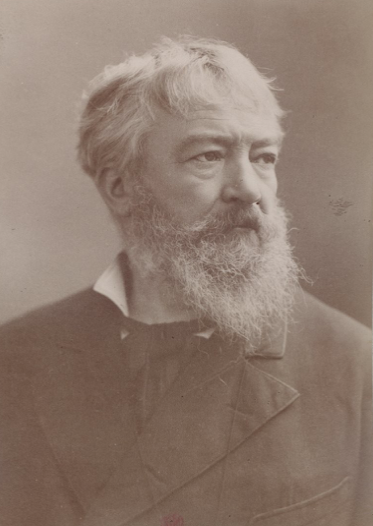
- Born: Auguste Marie Boulard; May 12, 1825; Paris, France
- Died: October 11, 1897 (aged 72); L'Isle-Adam, France
- Known for: Painting
- Style: Romanticism

Signature
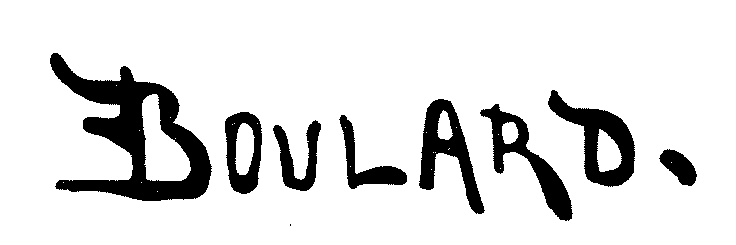

Auguste Marie Boulard (May 12, 1825 – October 11, 1897), also known as Auguste Boulard the Elder, was a French painter.

== Early life ==
Auguste Marie Boulard was born on May 12, 1825, in Paris, France, on Rue Saint-Antoine.

== Career ==
Boulard started painting at the age of 15 years old. He received artistic training from the realist academic painter Léon Cogniet. In the early 1840s, he frequented Cogniet's studio in Paris.

He took up residence in Antwerp around 1843, and exposure to its coastal life reshaped his subject matter to include seascapes and fishermen.

After 1850, he gravitated toward the Oise Valley, first frequenting Champagne-sur-Oise and later establishing himself in L'Isle-Adam. During this period, he entered the orbit of the Barbizon master Jules Dupré, becoming his pupil and learning to paint landscapes directly from nature. Boulard shared the principles and aims of the Barbizon School. His artistic curiosity drove him to study broad horizons, shifting skies, and coastal landscapes.

He was residing in Paris when he had his firstborn son in 1852. The Parisian landscape painter associated with the artistic circle of the Île Saint-Louis, where he lived and maintained a studio at 13 quai d’Anjou. Boulard, a neighbor of Honoré Daumier on the Île Saint-Louis, belonged to a group with Daumier, Charles-François Daubigny, Jean-Baptiste-Camille Corot, Jean-François Millet, Théodore Rousseau, Adolphe Victor Geoffroy-Dechaume, and Antoine-Louis Barye. His studio where he gave private painting lessons was near the Hôtel de Lauzun (historically Hôtel Pimodan).

By 1855, his paintings increasingly portrayed rustic scenes drawn from peasant life in Val-d'Oise. He visited Antwerp in 1858, which allowed him to meet Eugène Delacroix and reestablish contact with Honoré Daumier. Boulard later settled in the village of Cayeux with Jules Dupré around 1865. While in Cayeux, he focused on painting local fishermen and the interiors of their rustic homes.

He was patronized by American art dealer George A. Lucas in 1868 and 1869. A still life of apples that he painted entered Lucas's collection in 1869 for 100 francs. Boulard's son, who shared his first name, Auguste, was trained by the elder Boulard. He also counted Louis Marie Lemaire among his pupils. By 1880, Emilio Sánchez Perrier and Antonio de La Gandara were regular visitors at his studio on the Île Saint-Louis.

He achieved wider recognition with the inaugural Salon du Champ-de-Mars in 1890 and continued to exhibit there each year. Despite limited public recognition, his work was featured in articles by Jules Comte, Arsène Alexandre, Gonzague Privat, and Eugène Bertol-Graivil. The State supported Boulard by placing two of his works in the national collection at the Luxembourg Museum (Musée du Luxembourg). Boulard's The Fisherman's Child, an oil painting, was purchased by the State in 1887 for the Luxembourg Museum. The Luxembourg Museum received an oil on wood by Boulard, titled The Cherry Child, in March 1895.

Galerie Georges Petit in Paris presented a selection of his works during an 1896 exhibition. The exhibition played a key role in confirming his status as a recognized artist of his time.

== Personal life ==
His children were Auguste Laurent Boulard and Émile Boulard. Auguste Boulard Sr. died on October 11, 1897, in L'Isle-Adam, Val-d'Oise, Île-de-France, France.

== Legacy ==
Following his death, his collection was sold through auctioneer Paul Chevallier at the Hôtel Drouot in Paris in April 1900. The catalogue was compiled by gallery owner Georges Petit. The sale comprised paintings and watercolors by Boulard, alongside old and modern paintings, watercolors, pastels, drawings, and engravings by various artists. The sale also included bronzes by Antoine-Louis Barye, ceramics, clocks, works of art, studio furnishings, antique furniture, and 18th-century tapestries.

Boulard's work was showcased at the Exposition Universelle in 1900.

In 1994, the Louis Senlecq Museum of Art and History in L'Isle-Adam held an exhibition titled "Auguste Boulard, the last of the Romantics". Paintings from his Cayeux period were gathered to form the exhibition.

60 paintings from Boulard's atelier were sold at auction in L'Isle-Adam in February 2024, highlighting continued interest in his work.

== Works ==
- L'Enfant du pêcheur (The Fisherman's Child)
- L'Enfant aux cerises (The Cherry Child)
- Marine, berger et mouton sur un rivage (Marine, shepherd and sheep on a shore)
- Portrait du père de l'artiste (Portrait of the artist's father)

== Gallery ==
Selected works by Auguste Boulard

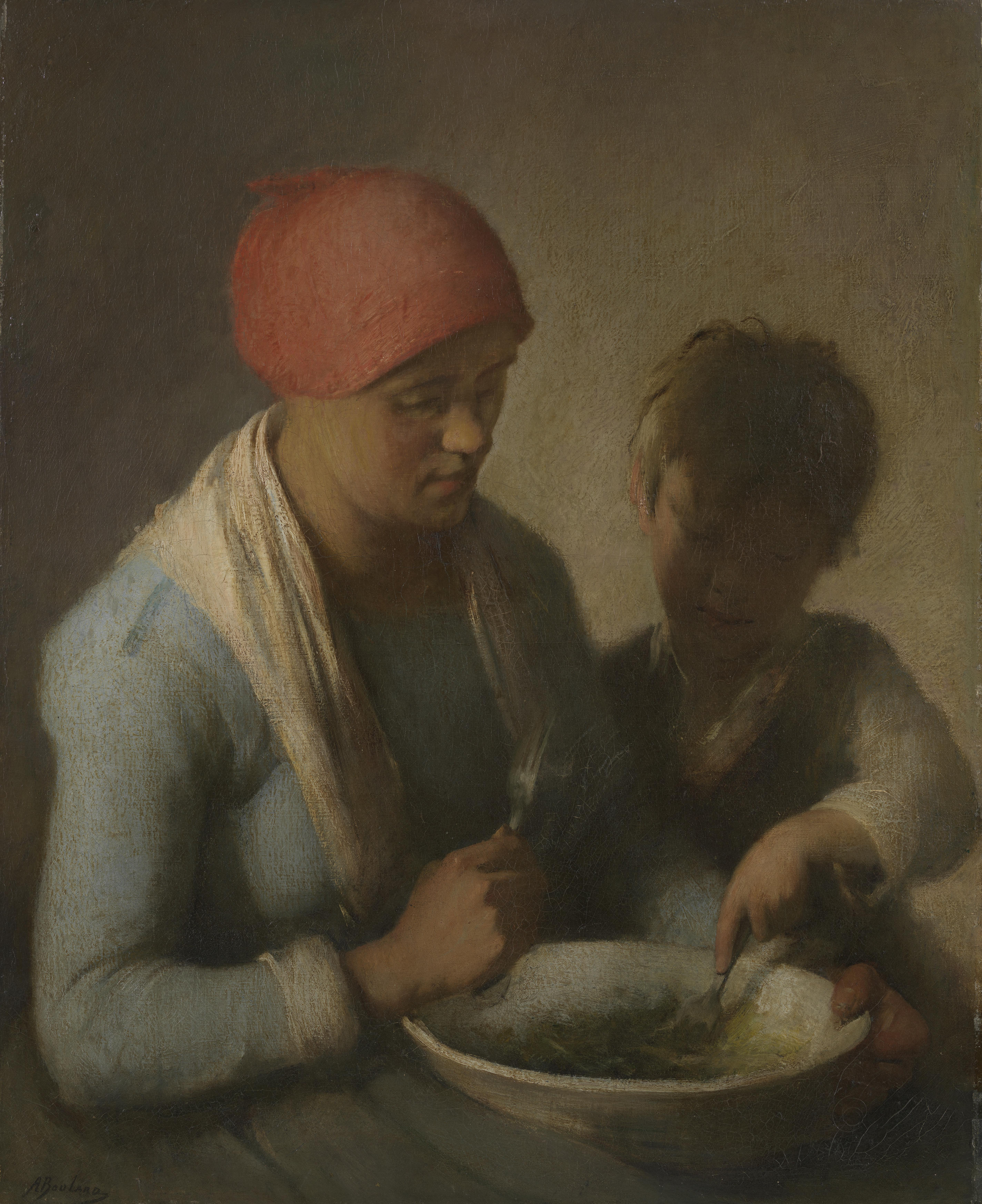
De maaltijd

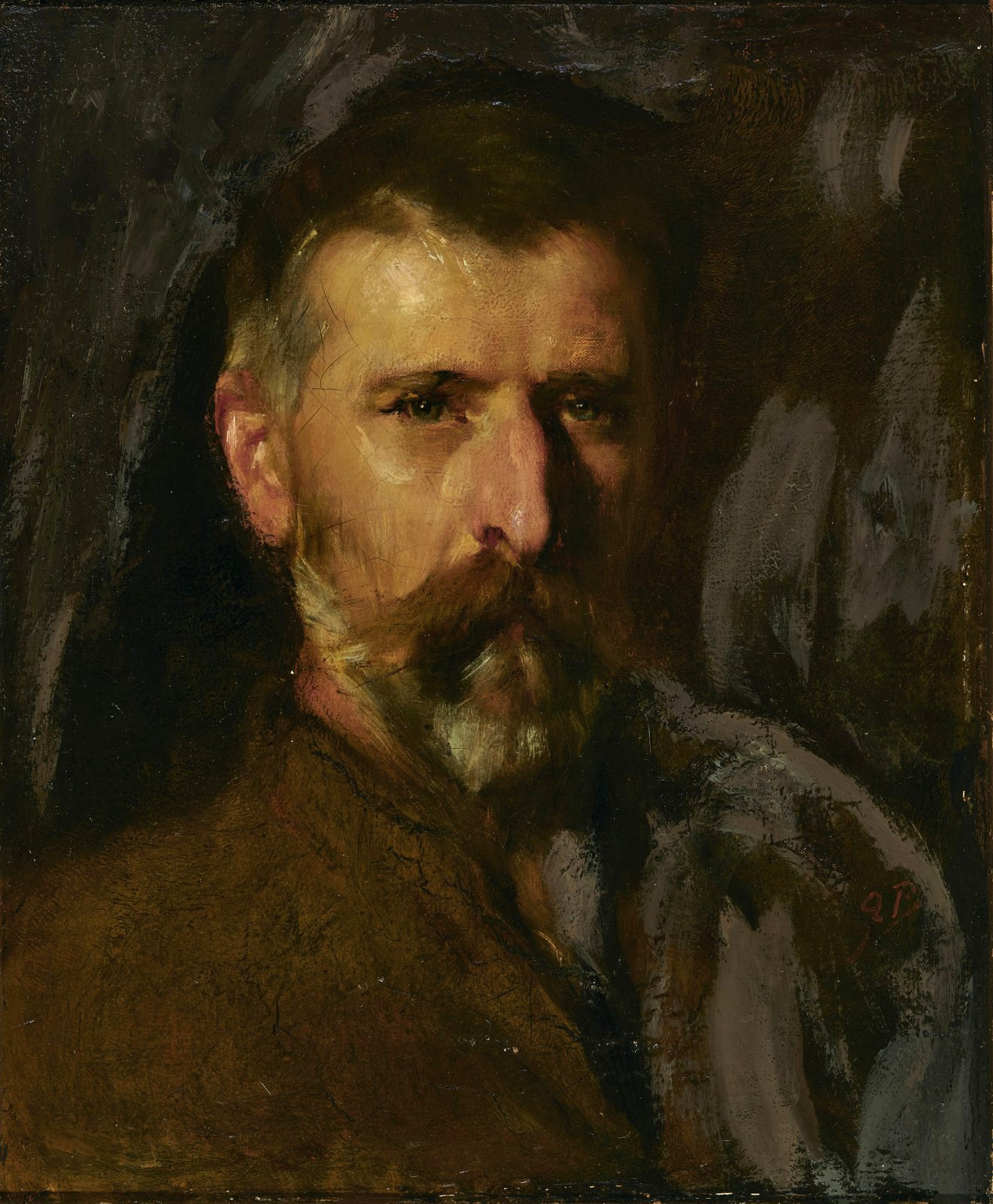
Portrait of Charles de Pidoll

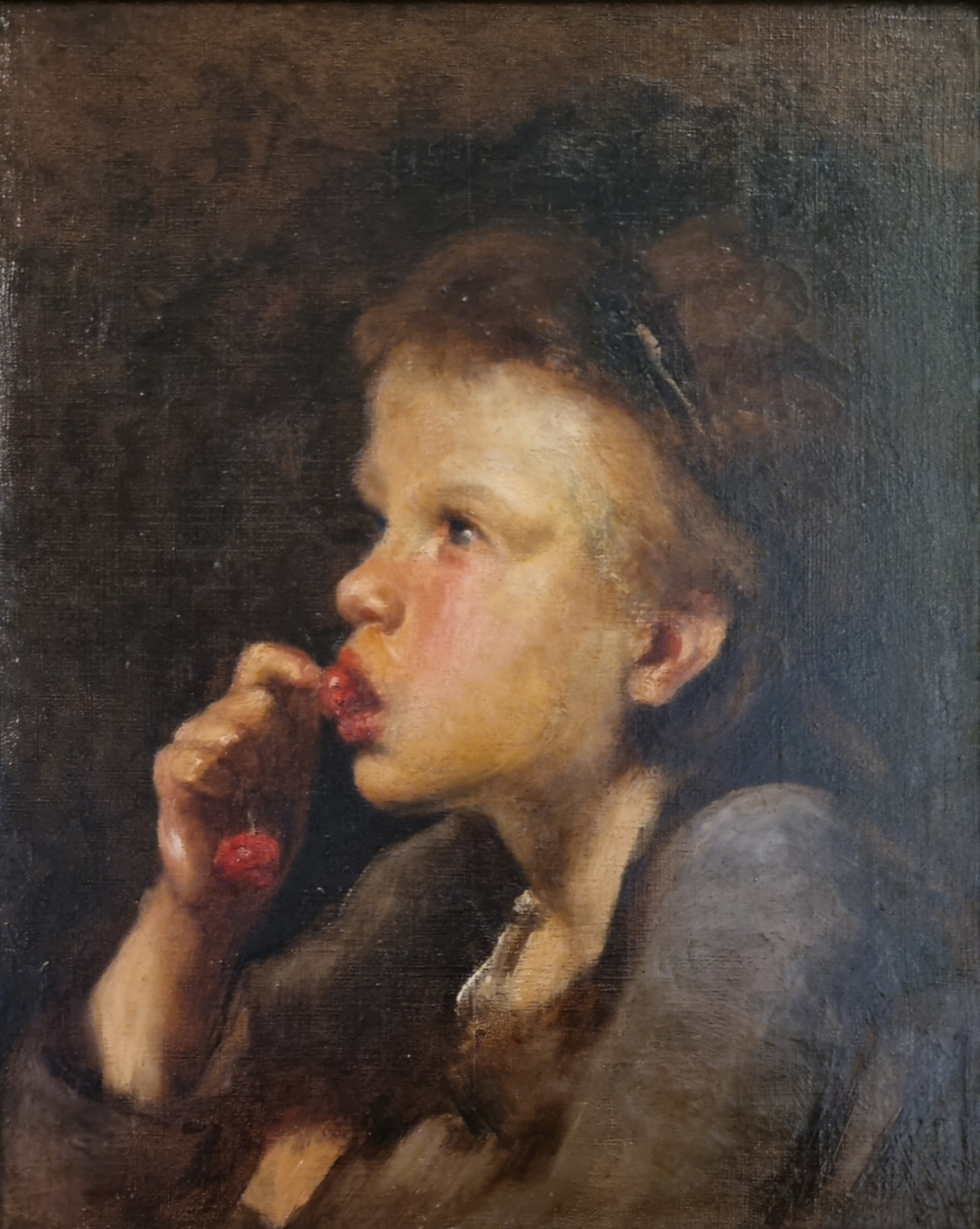
L'Enfant aux cerises

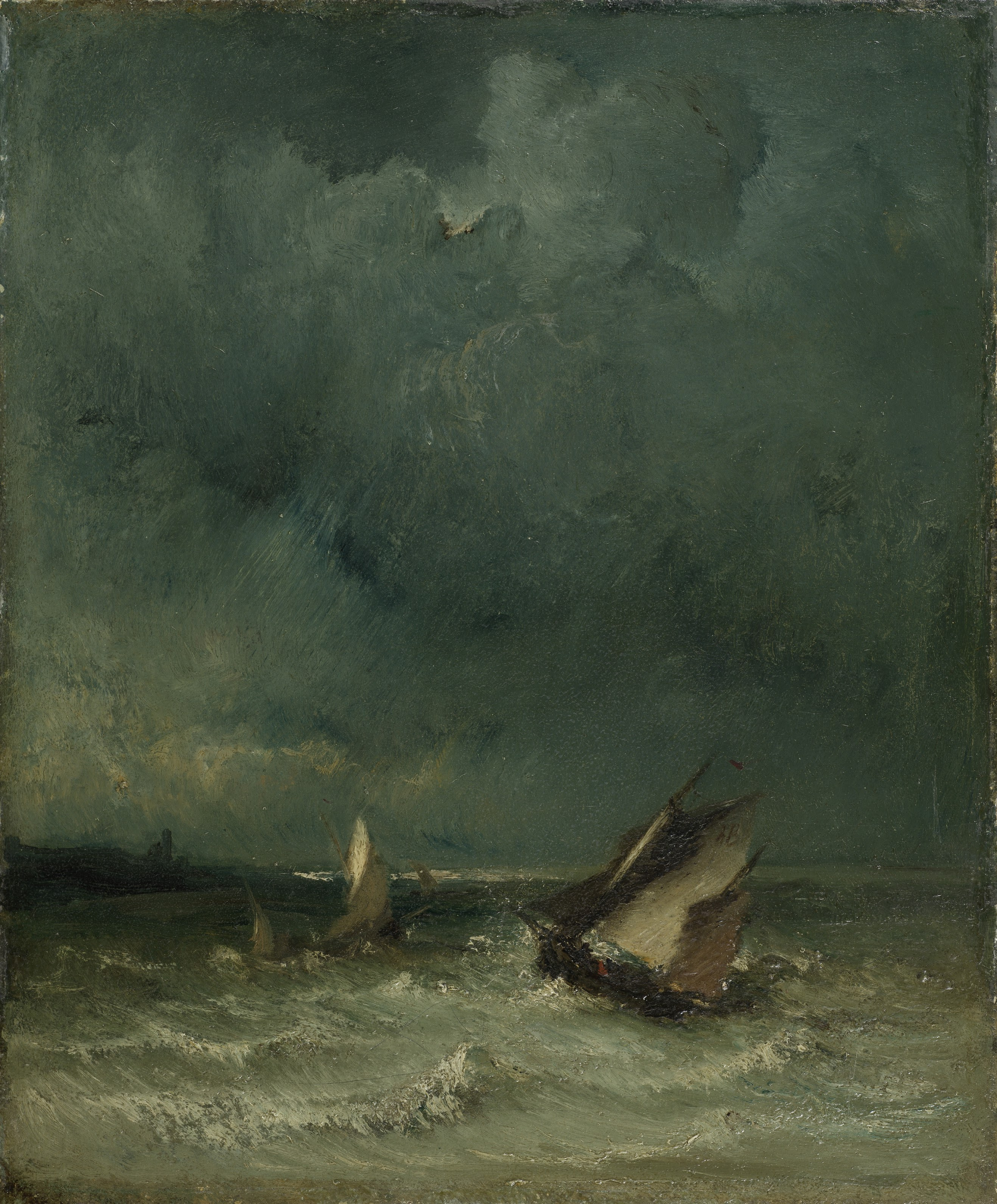
Zeegezicht

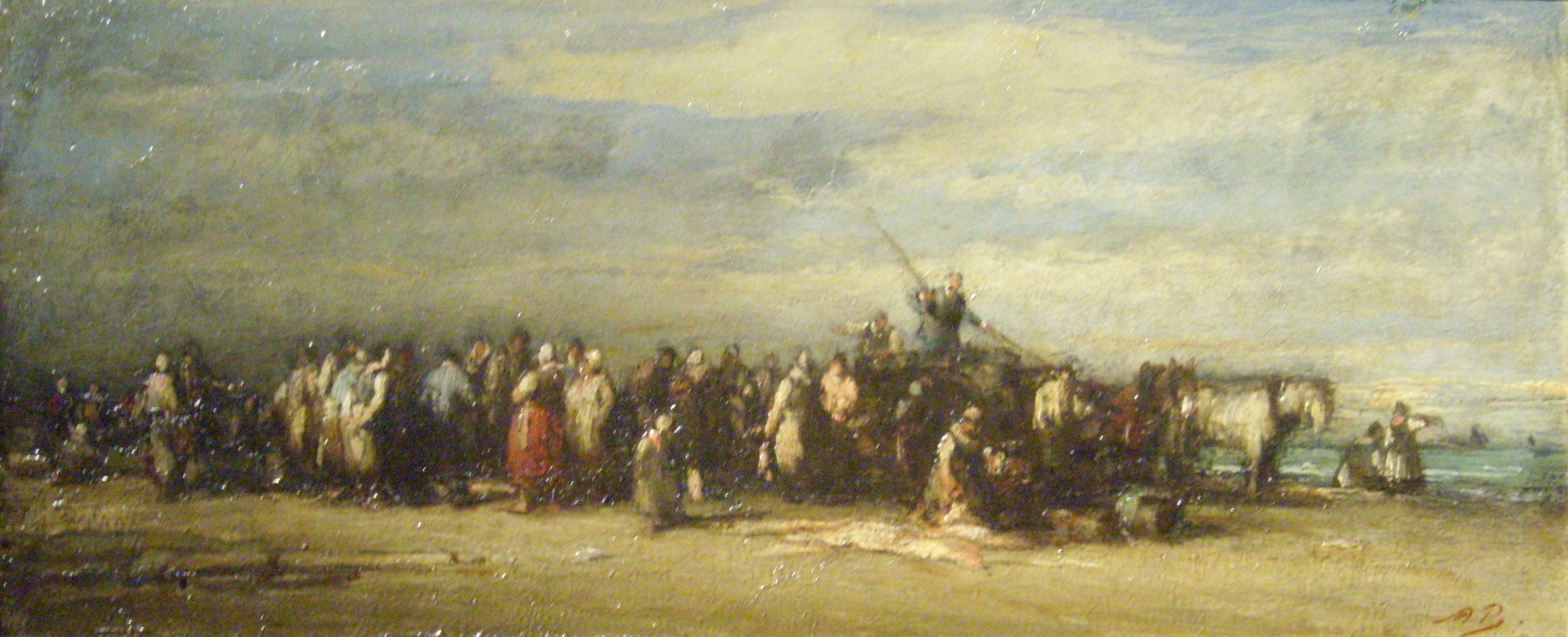
Retour de pêche
