= Auguste Boulard (painter, born 1852) =

French painter and engraver (1852-1927)

Auguste Laurent Boulard
- Born: Auguste Laurent Adolphe Boulard; 29 February 1852; Paris, France
- Died: 5 December 1927 (aged 75); Paris, France
- Burial place: Père Lachaise Cemetery
- Known for: Painting
- Father: Auguste Boulard
- Awards: Salon Medal of Honour (1900); Knight of the Legion of Honour (1900)

Auguste Laurent Adolphe Boulard (29 February 1852 – 5 December 1927), also known as Auguste Boulard fils, was a French painter and engraver.

== Early life ==
Auguste Laurent Adolphe Boulard was born on 29 February 1852, in Paris, France. He was the firstborn son of Auguste Boulard.

== Career ==
His earliest instruction came from his father, a respected Parisian painter. He trained at the studio of Victor Foulquier, followed by instruction in etching from Félix Bracquemond. In 1872, he joined the studio of Jean-Léon Gérôme at the École des Beaux-Arts, remaining for six years.

His debut at the Paris Salon took place in 1873. By 1880, Auguste, the younger Boulard, etched a portrait of French artist Honoré Daumier, which was exhibited at the Salon of 1881. He received an honorable mention at the Paris Salon of 1882.

His breakthrough came with an etching based on Édouard Detaille's 1881 oil painting My Old Regiment (Mon Ancien Regiment). The etching titled Le salut au drapeau d’après Detaille was published as a print by Georges Petit in October 1884 and is part of the Petit Palais collection.

Boulard earned a third-class medal at the Salon of 1885. He later received a bronze medal at the 1889 Paris Exposition.

He etched the illustrations for André Theuriet's novel Getrude's Secret (Le secret de Gertrude) in 1890.

In 1892, he earned a first-class medal at the Paris Salon. He became known for reproducing works by Ernest Meissonier and François Flameng. At the 1894 Universal Exhibition of Fine Arts in Antwerp, Boulard showcased his etching Le Femeur (after Meissonier). At the time, he was residing on the Île Saint-Louis at 29 Quai de Bourbon.

Boulard was recognised with a Medal of Honor (Médaille d’Honneur) in the engraving and lithography category at the Salon of the Société des Artistes Français on April 21, 1900. The painter-engraver secured 49 of 56 votes. He was awarded a Gold Medal (Médaille d'Or) following the 1900 Universal Exhibition in Paris and appointed Knight of the Legion of Honor on 16 August 1900.

In 1903, a visit to Pontrieux led him to discover the port of Loguivy-de-la-Mer. He acquired land at Beg an Enez in Loguivy-de-la-Mer and, in 1913, built a house where his family stayed seasonally for six months out of the year. The house included a studio for painting and engraving.

== Personal life ==
His wife, Pauline, was the granddaughter of the French historian and writer Jules Michelet.

== Death ==
Auguste Boulard Jr. died on 5 December 1927, in Paris, France. His remains are laid to rest at Père Lachaise Cemetery.

== Gallery ==
Selected works by Auguste Laurent Boulard

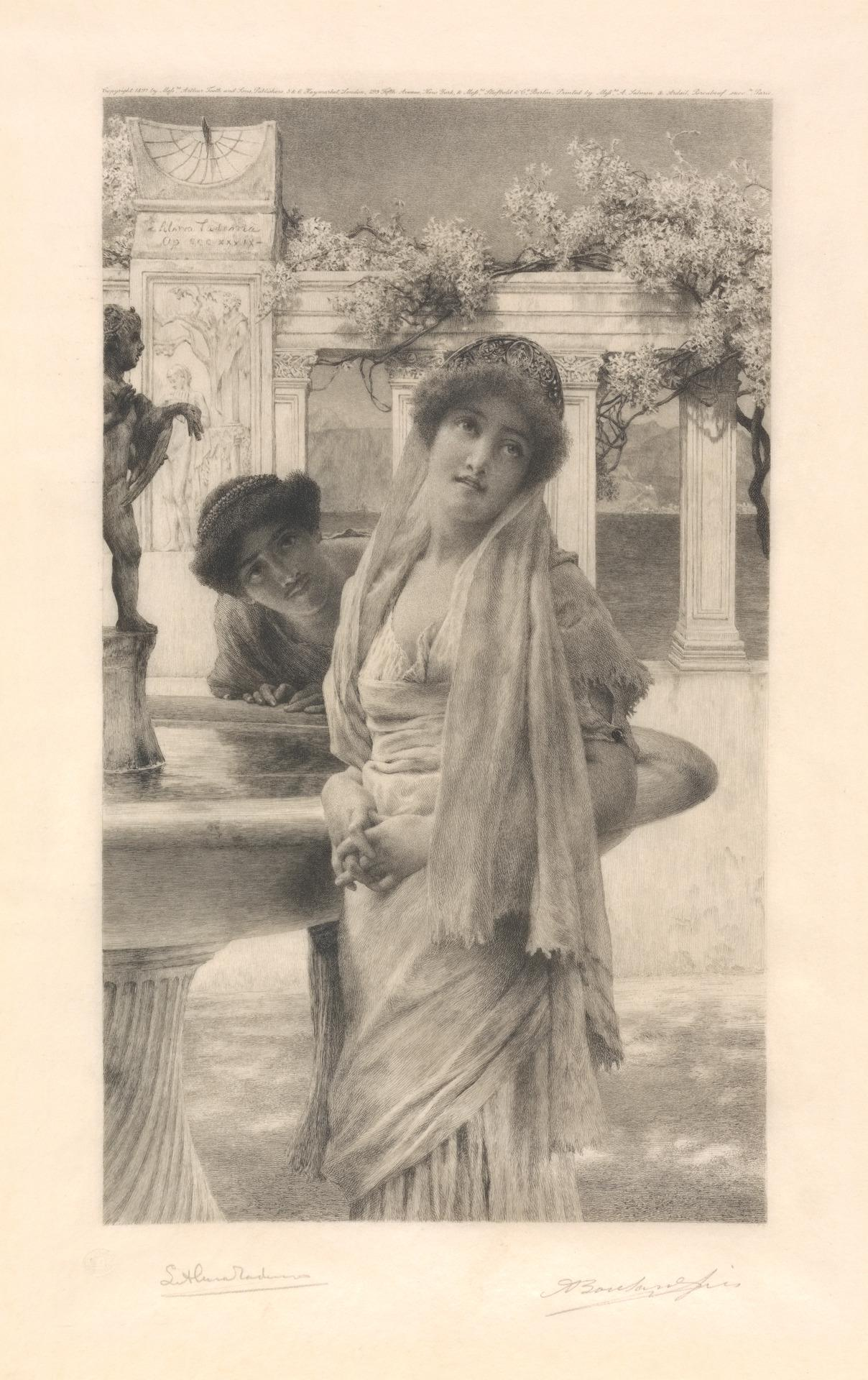
A Difference of Opinion (1897)

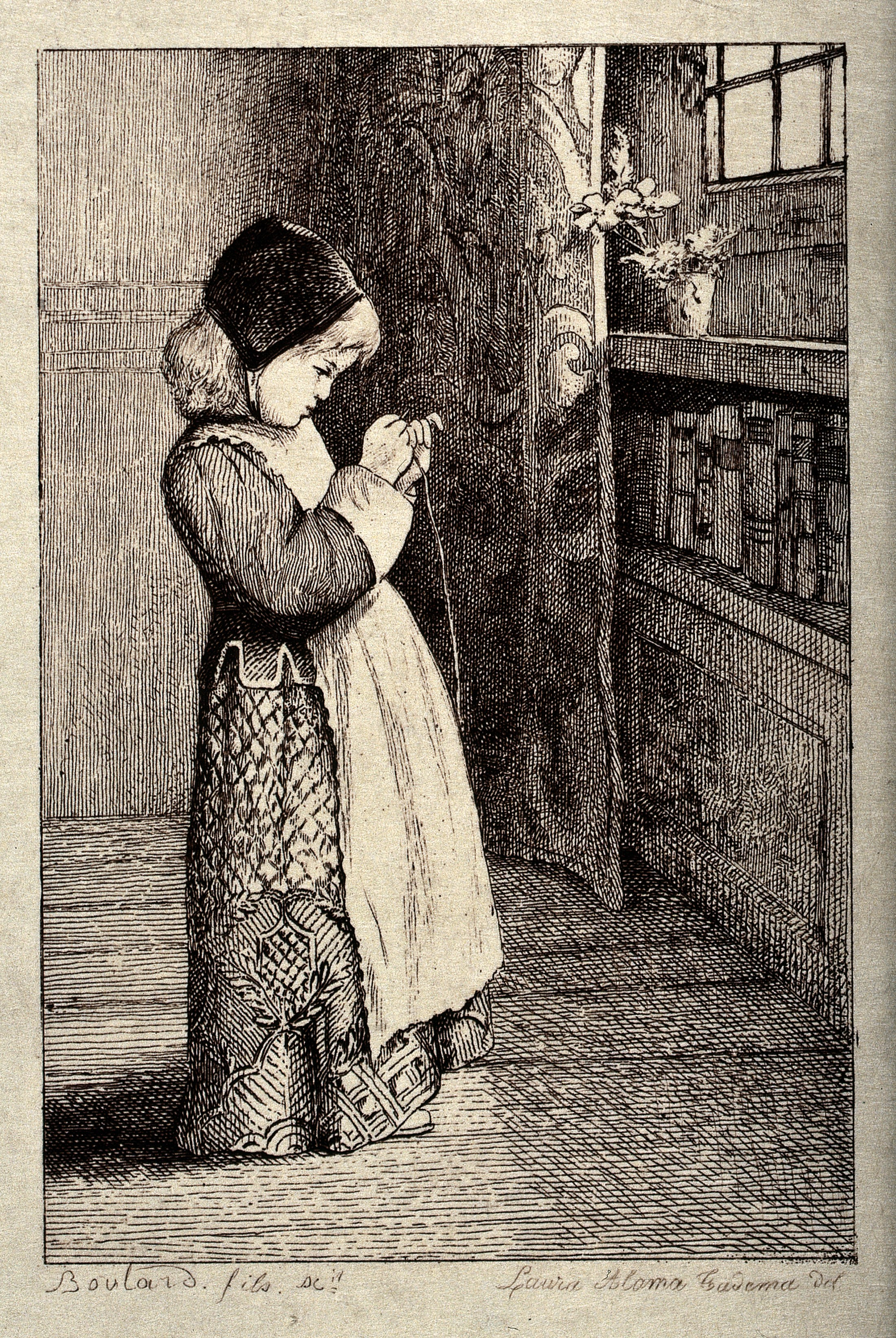
A little girl stands in a room working with a needle

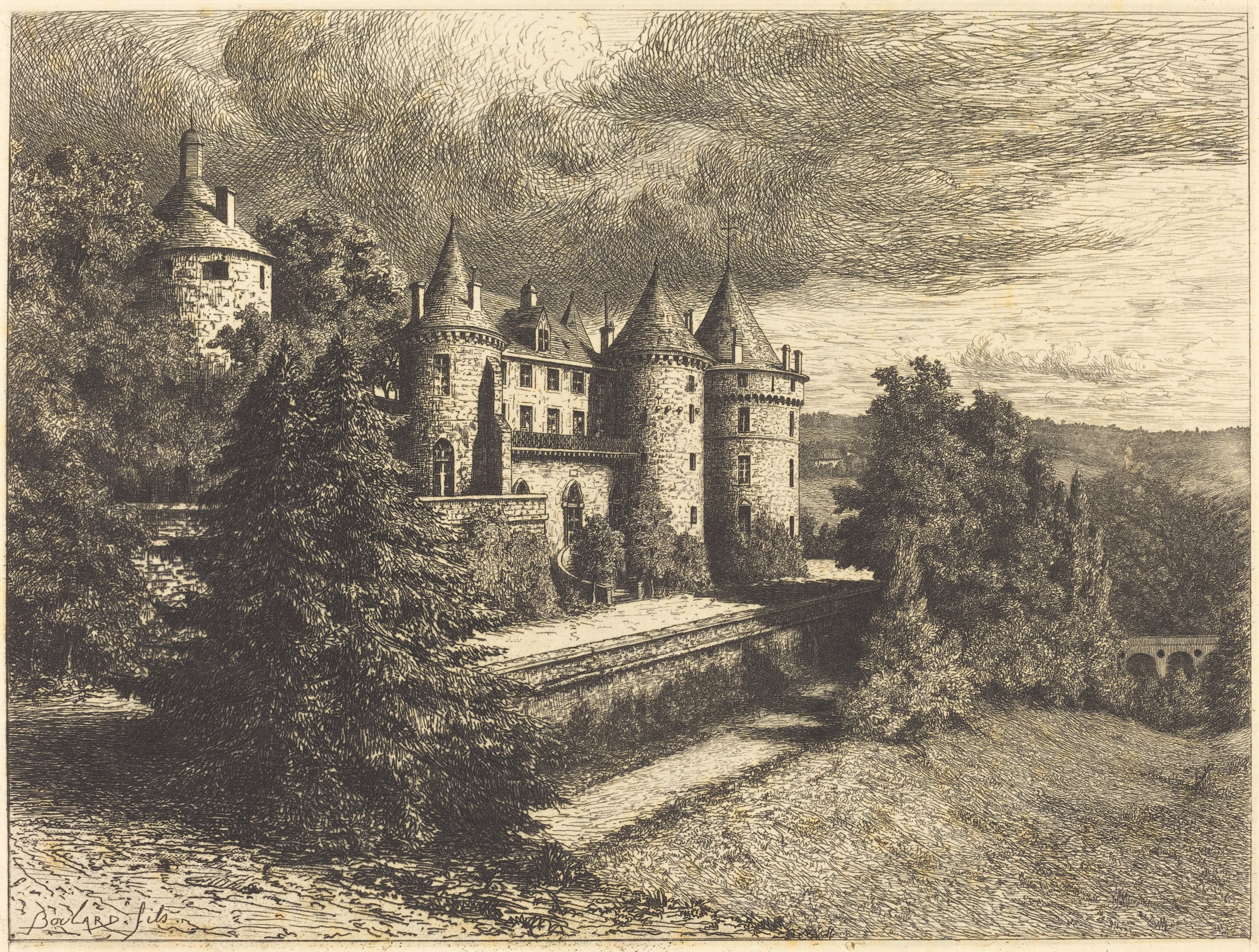
Château on a Rise

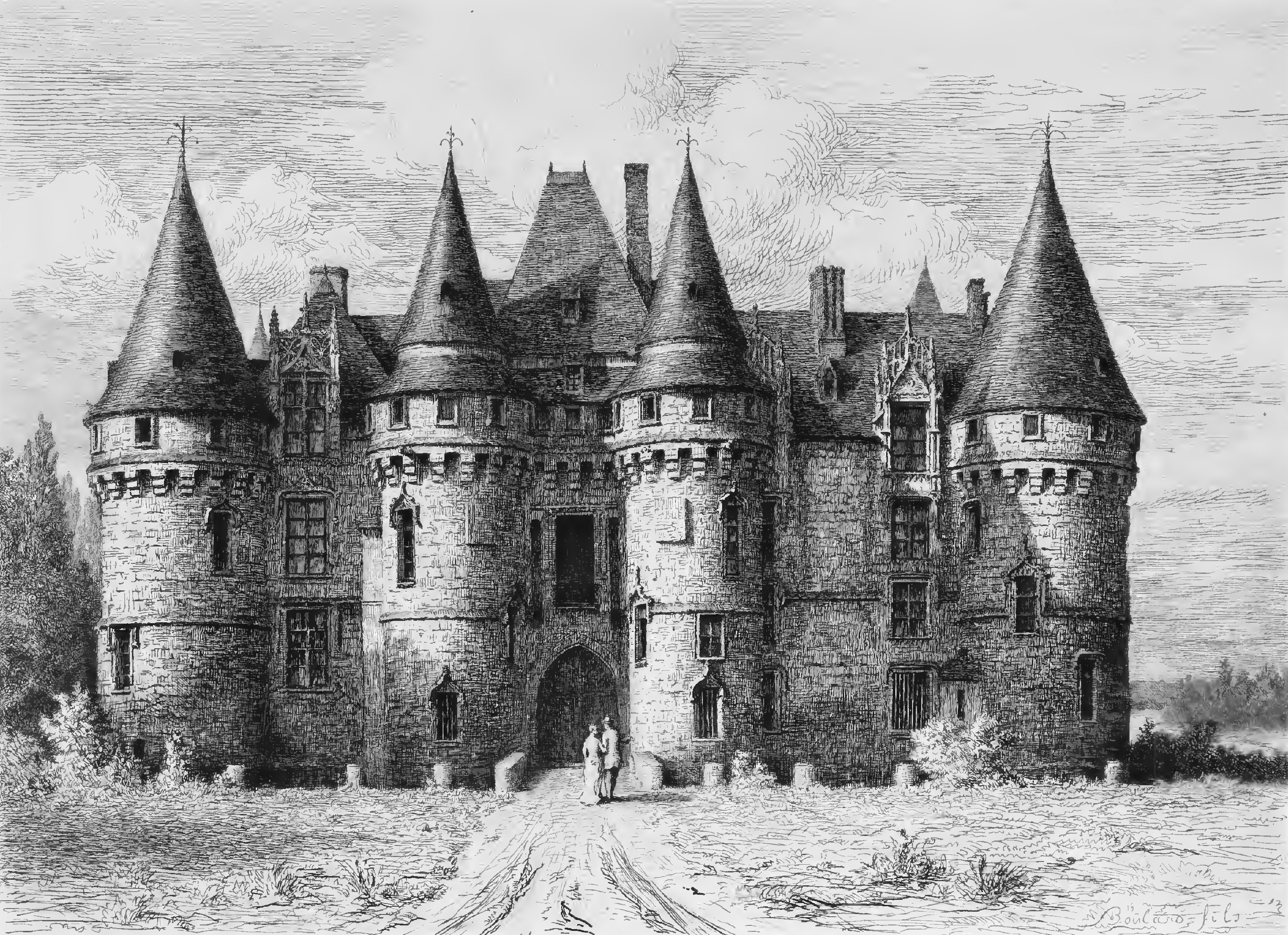
Château de Vigny

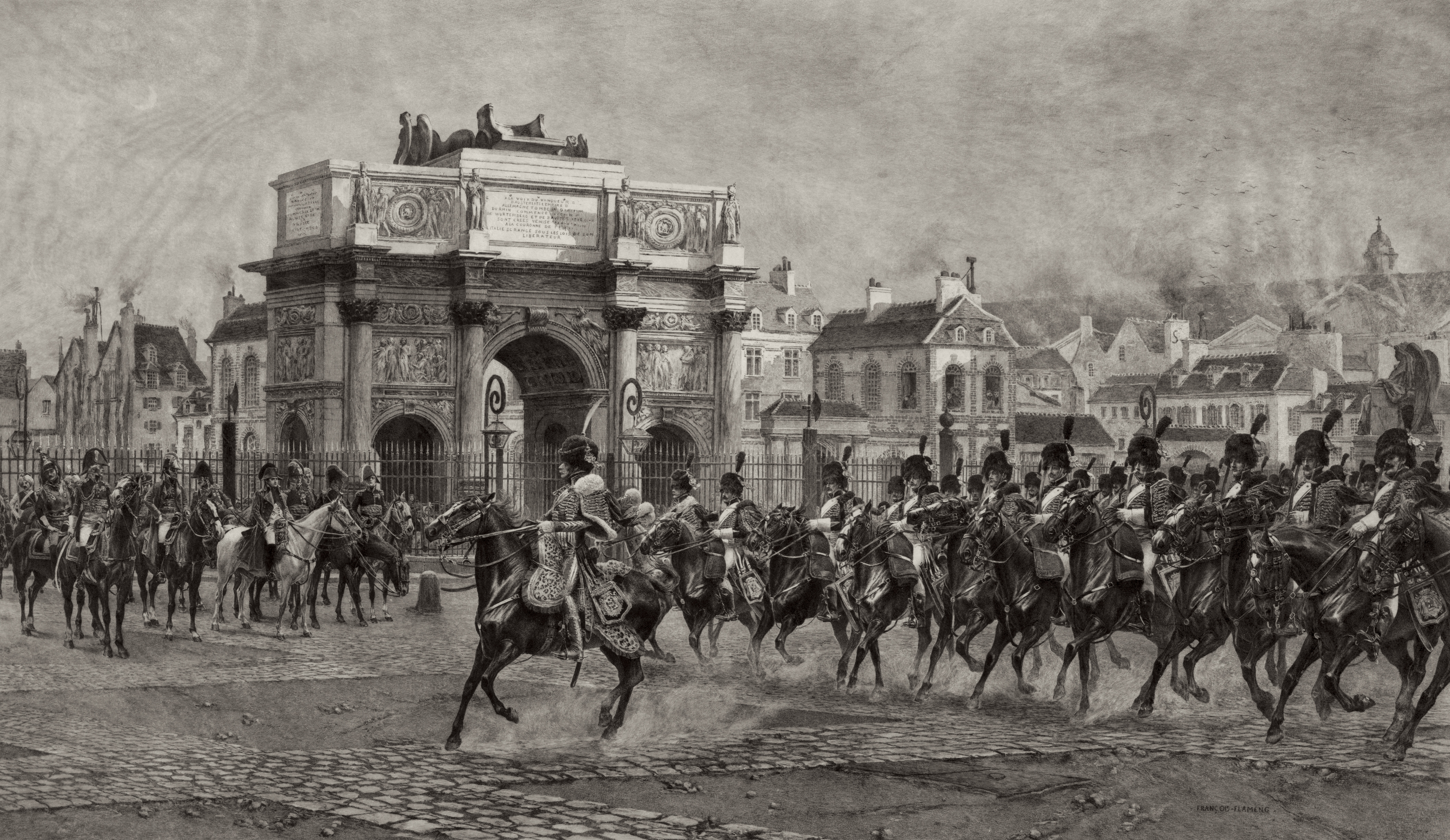
La Revue 1810

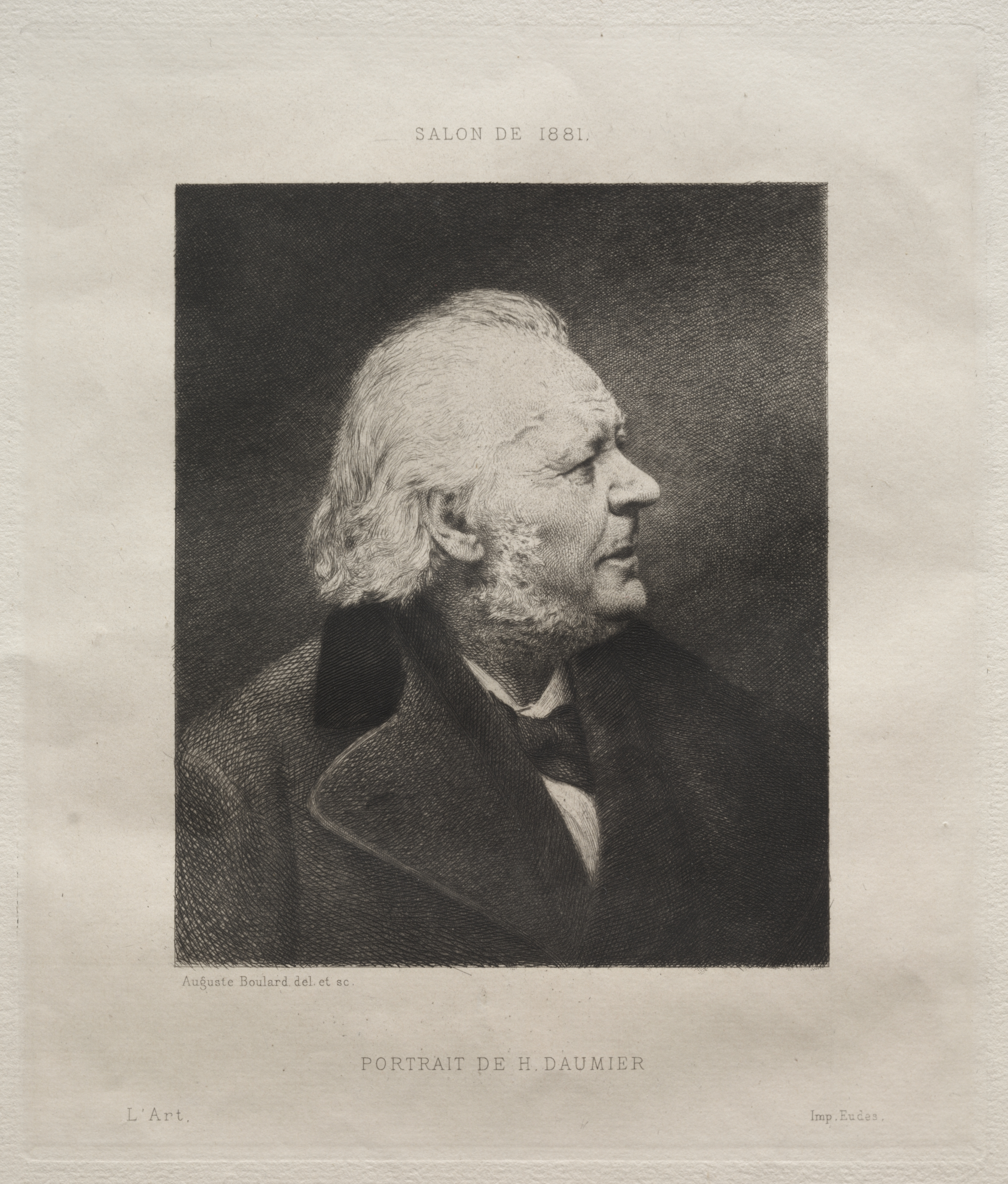
Portrait of Honoré Daumier (1880)
