= Porcelain =

Ceramic material

- Chinese: 瓷
Transcriptions
Standard Mandarin
- Hanyu Pinyin: cí
- Wade–Giles: tz'ŭ^{2}
- IPA: [tsʰɹ̩̌]
Yue: Cantonese
- Yale Romanization: chìh
- Jyutping: ci4
- IPA: [tsʰi˩]
Southern Min
- Tâi-lô: hûi

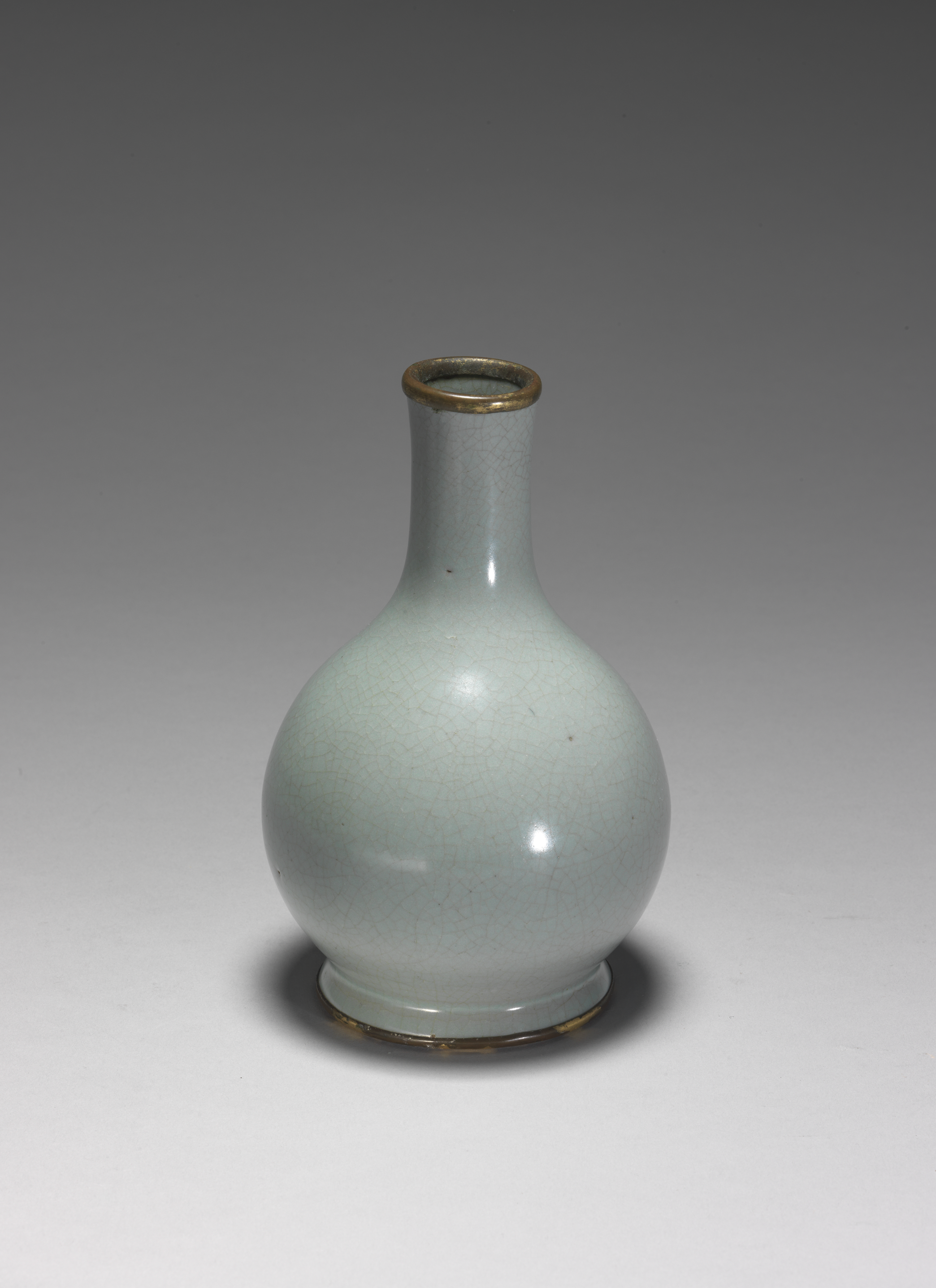
Chinese Ru ware celadon-glazed bottle vase, Northern Song, 11th–12th century

Porcelain (/ˈpɔːrs(ə)lɪn/), also called china, is a ceramic material made by heating raw materials, generally including kaolinite, in a kiln to temperatures between 1,200 and 1,400 °C (2,200 and 2,600 °F). The greater strength and translucence of porcelain, relative to other types of pottery, arise mainly from vitrification and the formation of the mineral mullite within the body at these high temperatures. End applications include tableware, decorative ware such as figurines, and products in technology and industry such as electrical insulators and laboratory ware.

The manufacturing process used for porcelain is similar to that used for earthenware and stoneware, the two other main types of pottery, although it can be more challenging to produce. It has usually been regarded as the most prestigious type of pottery due to its delicacy, strength, and high degree of whiteness. It is frequently both glazed and decorated.

Though definitions vary, porcelain can be divided into three main categories: hard-paste, soft-paste, and bone china. The categories differ in the composition of the body and the firing conditions.

Porcelain originated in China, the result of centuries of ceramic experimentation by Chinese potters. Depending on the definition used, the technology matured between approximately 200 and 800 CE. It later spread to other countries in Asia, then to Europe, and eventually to the rest of the world. The European name, porcelain in English, comes from the old Italian porcellana (cowrie shell) because of its resemblance to the surface of the shell. Porcelain is also referred to as "china" or fine china in some English-speaking countries, as it was first seen in imports from China during the 17th century. Properties associated with porcelain include low permeability and elasticity; considerable strength, hardness, whiteness, translucency, and resonance; and a high resistance to corrosive chemicals and thermal shock.

Porcelain has been described as being "completely vitrified, hard, impermeable (even before glazing), white or artificially coloured, translucent (except when of considerable thickness), and resonant". However, the term "porcelain" lacks a universal definition and has "been applied in an unsystematic fashion to substances of diverse kinds that have only certain surface-qualities in common".

Traditionally, East Asia only classifies pottery into low-fired wares (earthenware) and high-fired wares (often translated as porcelain), the latter also including what Europeans call "stoneware", which is high-fired but not generally white or translucent. Terms such as "proto-porcelain", "porcellaneous", or "near-porcelain" may be used in cases where the ceramic body approaches whiteness and translucency.

In 2021, the global market for porcelain tableware was estimated to be worth US$22.1 billion.

== Types ==
=== Hard paste ===
Hard-paste porcelain was invented in China, and it was also used in Japanese porcelain. Most of the finest quality porcelain wares are made of this material. The earliest European porcelains were produced at the Meissen factory in the early 18th century; they were formed from a paste composed of kaolin and alabaster and fired at temperatures up to 1,400 °C (2,552 °F) in a wood-fired kiln, producing a porcelain of great hardness, translucency, and strength. Later, the composition of the Meissen hard paste was changed, and the alabaster was replaced by feldspar and quartz, allowing the pieces to be fired at lower temperatures. Kaolinite, feldspar, and quartz (or other forms of silica) continue to constitute the basic ingredients for most continental European hard-paste porcelains.

=== Soft paste ===
Soft-paste porcelains date back to early attempts by European potters to replicate Chinese porcelain by using mixtures of clay and frit. Soapstone and lime are known to have been included in these compositions. These wares were not yet actual porcelain wares, as they were neither hard nor vitrified by firing kaolin clay at high temperatures. As these early formulations suffered from high pyroplastic deformation, or slumping in the kiln at high temperatures, they were uneconomic to produce and of low quality.

Formulations were later developed based on kaolin with quartz, feldspars, nepheline syenite, or other feldspathic rocks. These are technically superior and continue to be produced. Soft-paste porcelains are fired at lower temperatures than hard-paste porcelains; therefore, these wares are generally less hard than hard-paste porcelains.

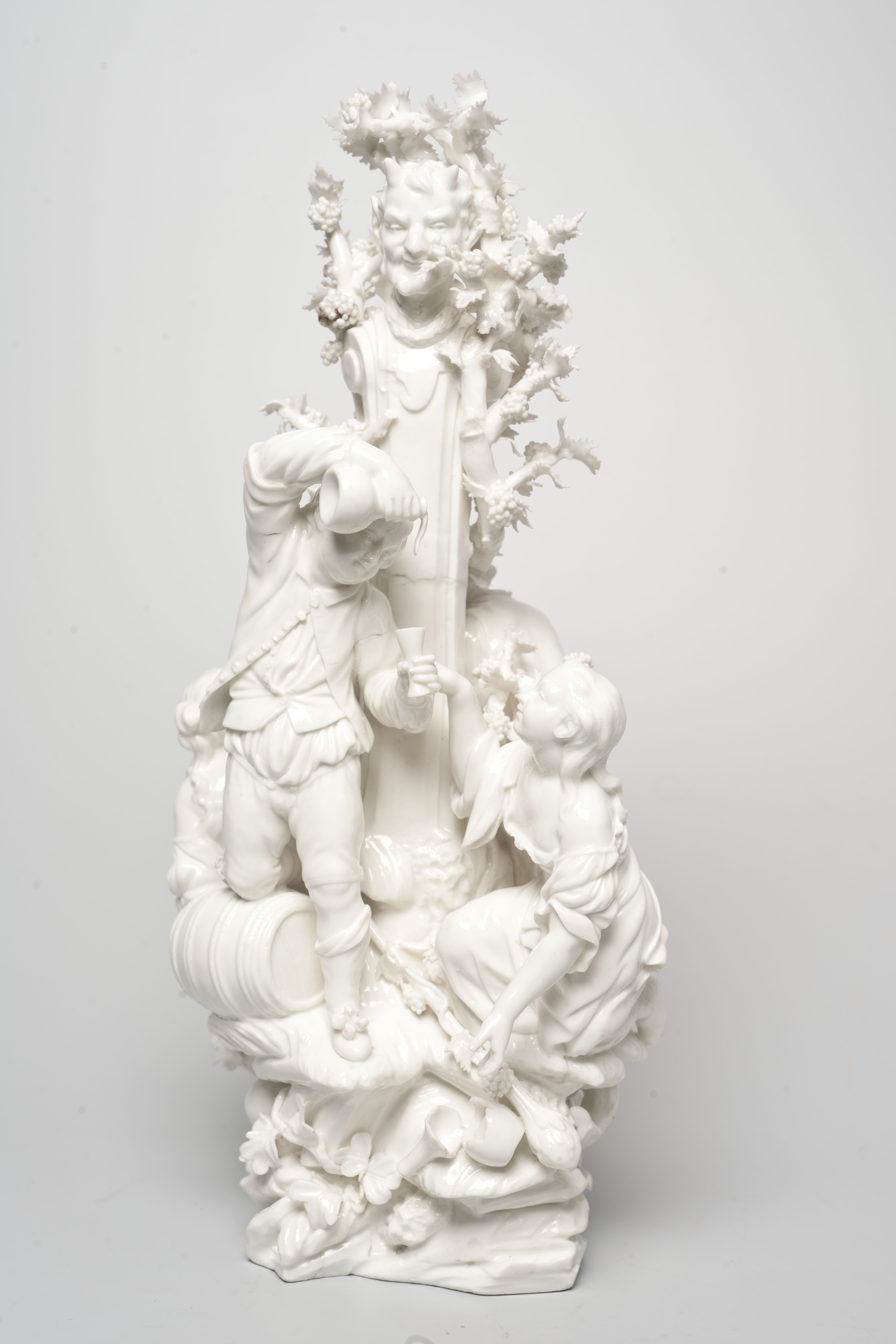

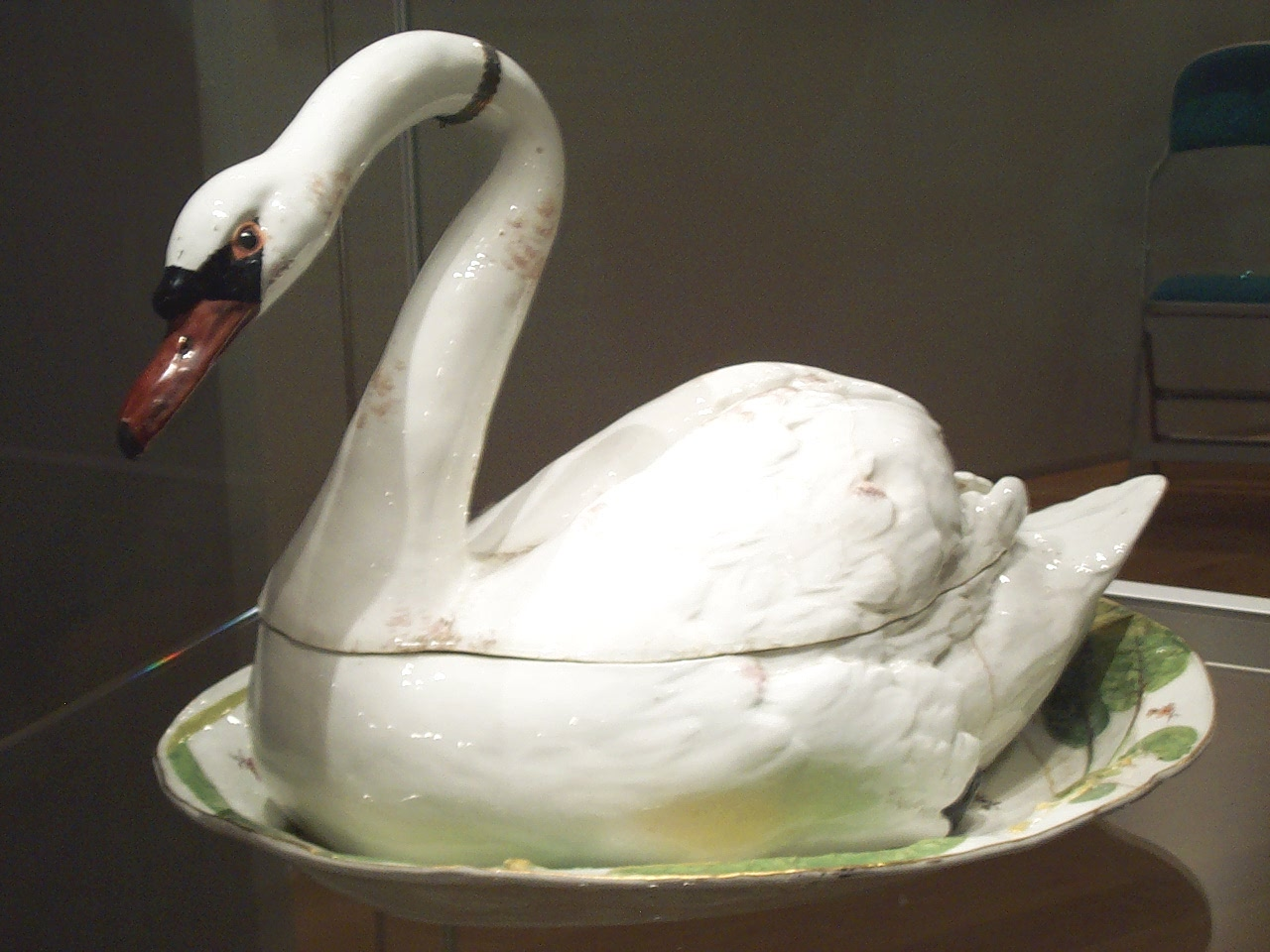
Soft-paste porcelain swan tureen, 1752–1756, Chelsea porcelain

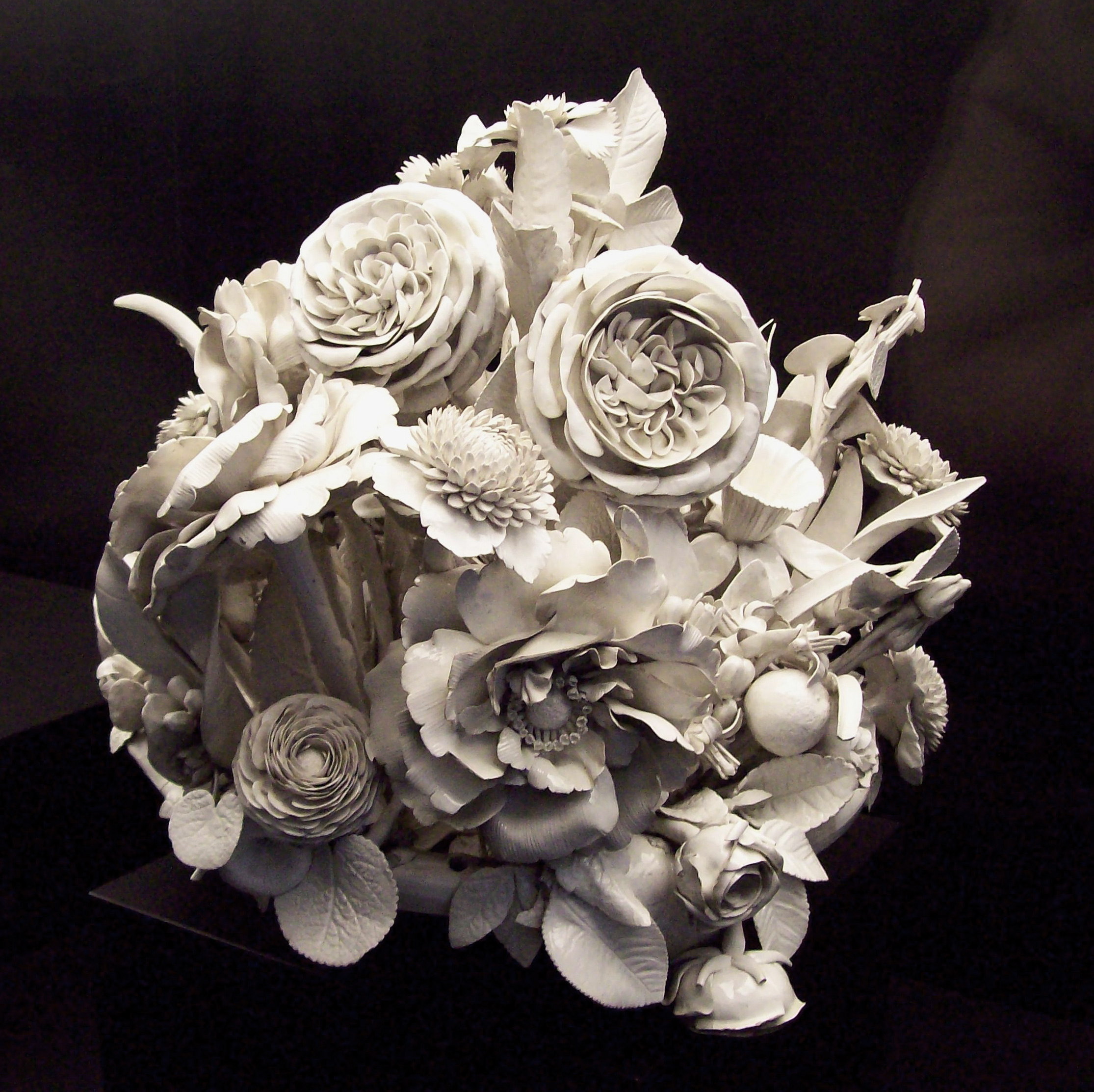
Flower centrepiece, 18th century, Spain

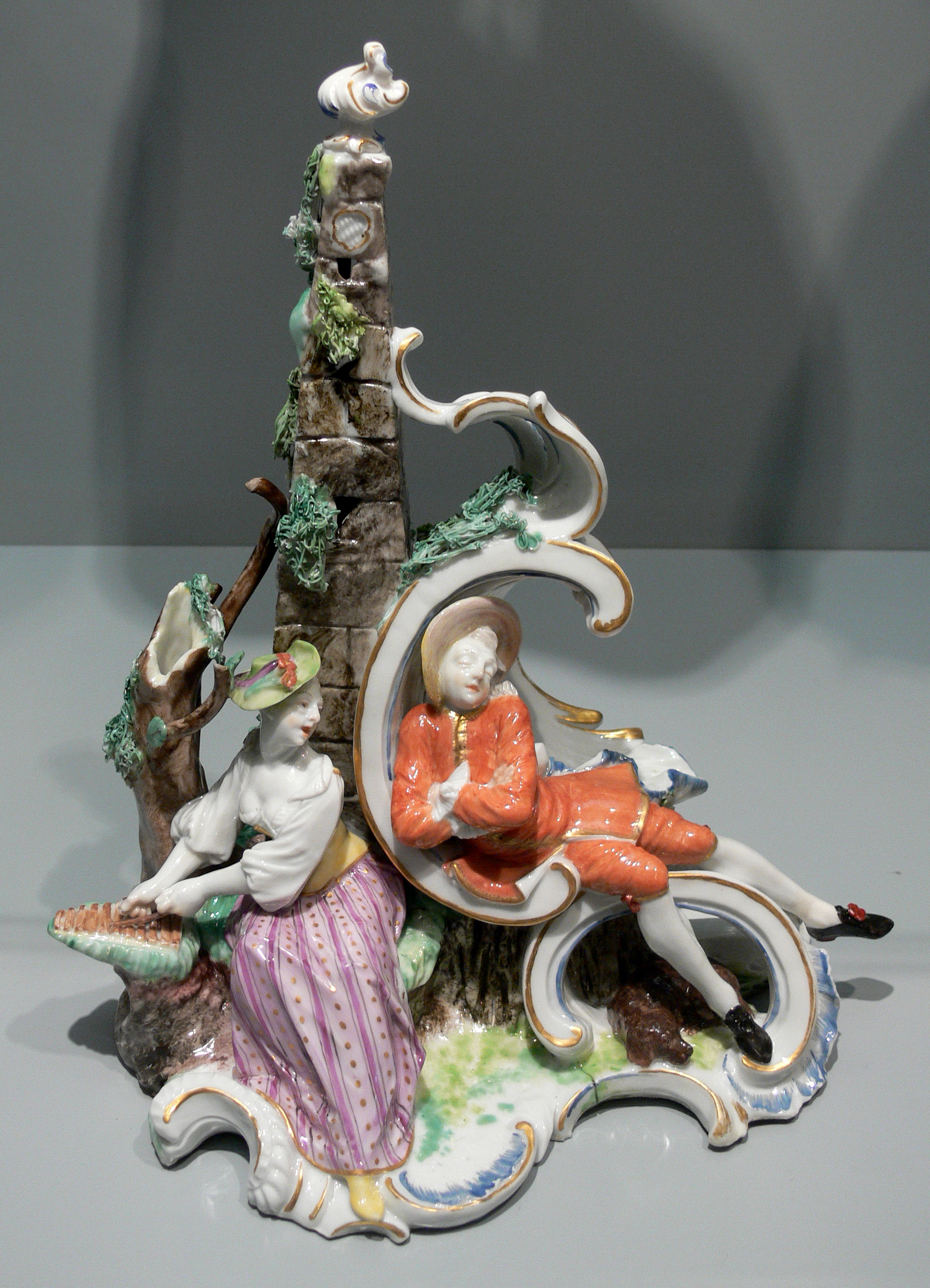
Nymphenburg porcelain group modelled by Franz Anton Bustelli, 1756

=== Bone china ===
Although originally developed in England in 1748 to compete with imported porcelain, bone china is now made worldwide, including in China. The English had read the letters of Jesuit missionary François Xavier d'Entrecolles, which described Chinese porcelain manufacturing secrets in detail. One writer has speculated that a misunderstanding of the text could possibly have been responsible for the first attempts to use bone-ash as an ingredient in English porcelain, although this is not supported by modern researchers and historians.

Traditionally, English bone china was made from two parts of bone ash, one part of kaolin, and one part of china stone, although the latter has been replaced by feldspars from non-UK sources.

== Materials ==
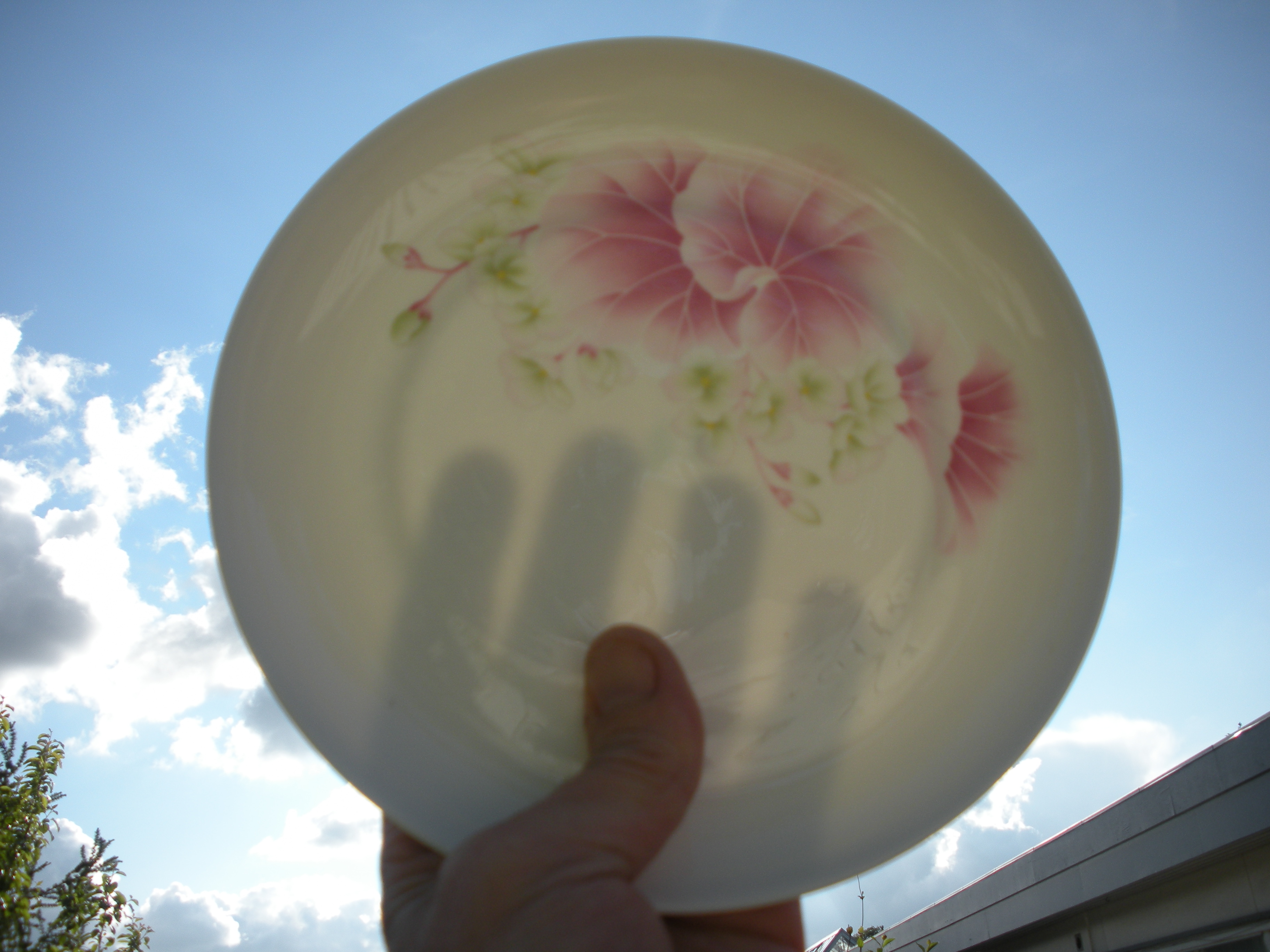
Demonstration of the translucent quality of porcelain

Kaolin is the primary material from which porcelain is made, even though clay minerals might account for only a small proportion of the whole. The word paste is an old term for both unfired and fired materials. A more common terminology for the unfired material is "body"; for example, when buying materials a potter might order an amount of porcelain body from a vendor.

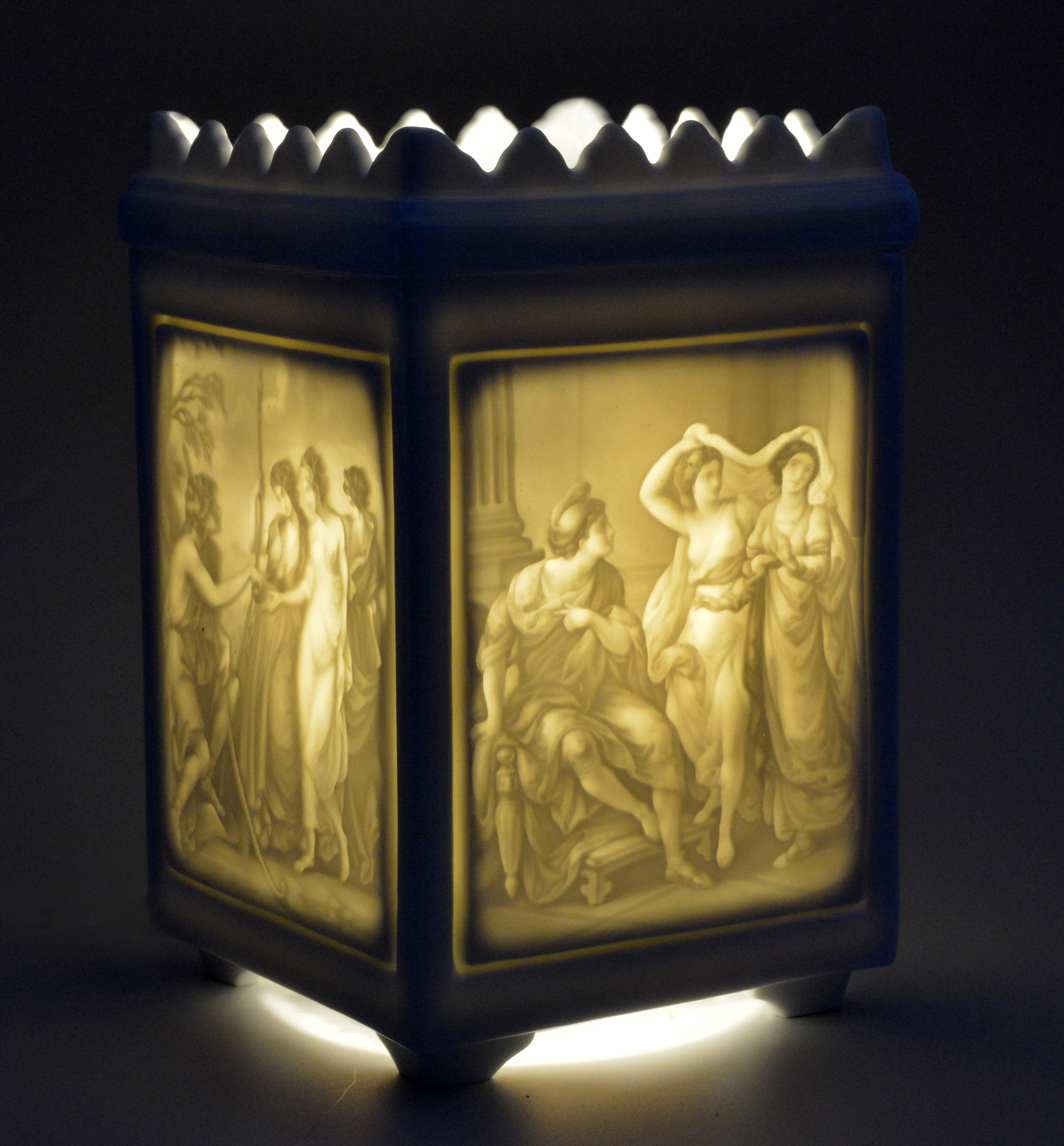
A lithophane exploits the translucency of porcelain

The composition of porcelain is highly variable, but the clay mineral kaolinite is often a raw material. Other raw materials can include feldspar, ball clay, glass, bone ash, steatite, quartz, petuntse and alabaster.

The clays used are often described as being long or short, depending on their plasticity. Long clays are cohesive (sticky) and have high plasticity; short clays are less cohesive and have lower plasticity. In soil mechanics, plasticity is determined by measuring the increase in content of water required to change a clay from a solid state bordering on the plastic, to a plastic state bordering on the liquid, though the term is also used less formally to describe the ease with which a clay may be worked.

Clays used for porcelain are generally of lower plasticity than many other pottery clays. They wet very quickly, meaning that small changes in the content of water can produce large changes in workability. Thus, the range of water content within which these clays can be worked is very narrow and consequently must be carefully controlled.

== Production ==
=== Forming ===
Porcelain can be made using all the shaping techniques for pottery.

=== Glazing ===
Biscuit porcelain is unglazed porcelain treated as a finished product, mostly for figures and sculpture. Unlike their lower-fired counterparts, porcelain wares do not need glazing to render them impermeable to liquids and for the most part are glazed for decorative purposes and to make them resistant to dirt and staining. Many types of glaze, such as the iron-containing glaze used on the celadon wares of Longquan, were designed specifically for their striking effects on porcelain.

=== Decoration ===
Porcelain often receives underglaze decoration using pigments that include cobalt oxide and copper, or overglaze enamels, allowing a wider range of colours. Like many earlier wares, modern porcelains are often biscuit-fired at around 1,000 °C (1,830 °F), coated with glaze and then sent for a second glaze-firing at a temperature of about 1,300 °C (2,370 °F) or greater. Another early method is "once-fired", where the glaze is applied to the unfired body and the two fired together in a single operation.

=== Firing ===
In this process, "green" (unfired) ceramic wares are heated to high temperatures in a kiln to permanently set their shapes, vitrify the body and the glaze. Porcelain is fired at a higher temperature than earthenware so that the body can vitrify and become non-porous. Many types of porcelain in the past have been fired twice or even three times, to allow decoration using less robust pigments in overglaze enamel.

== History ==
=== Chinese porcelain ===
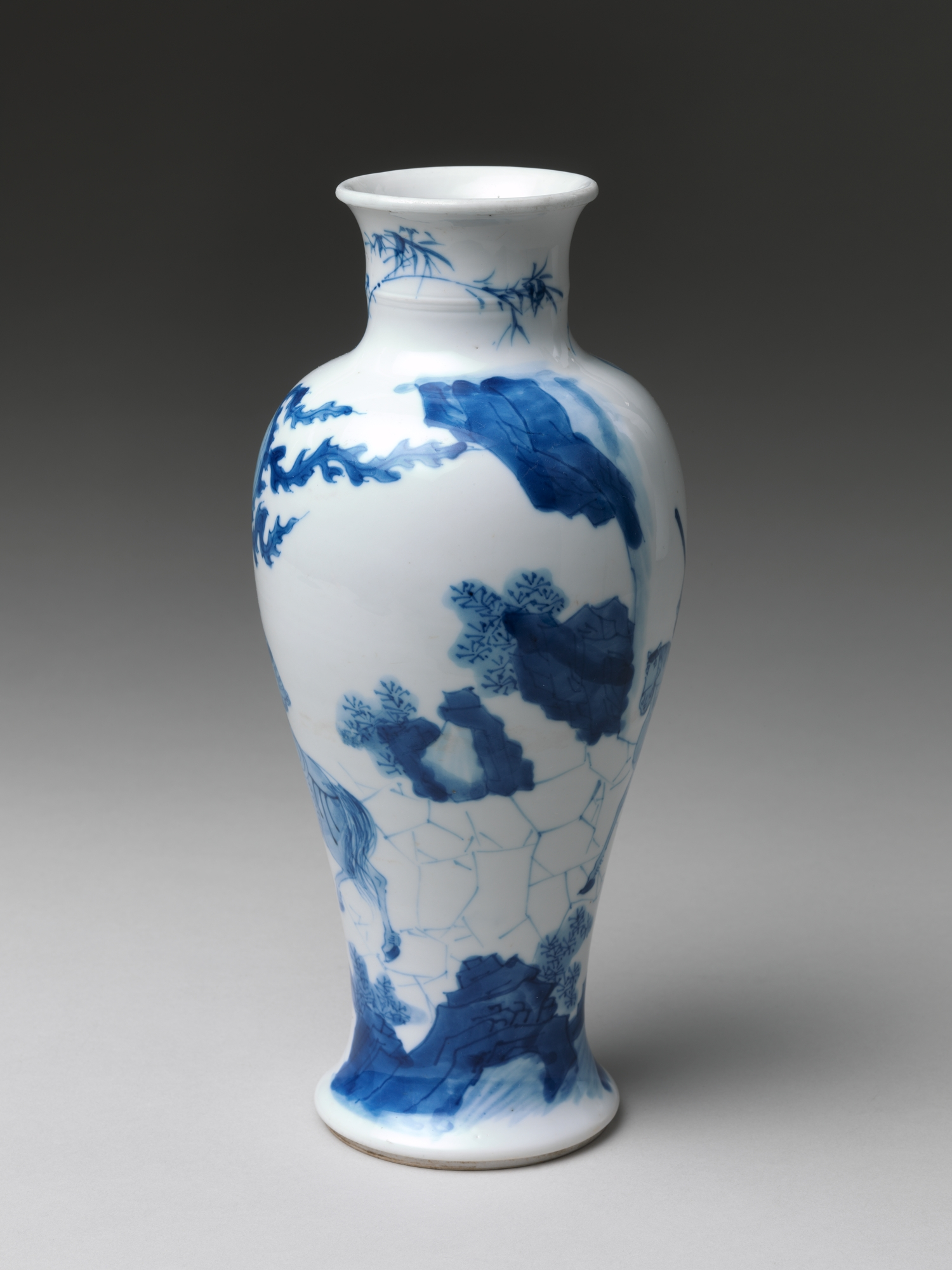
Jingdezhen blue and white porcelain vase, Qing dynasty, Kangxi period (late 17th century). Metropolitan Museum of Art.

Porcelain was invented in China over a centuries-long development period beginning with "proto-porcelain" wares dating from the Shang dynasty (1600–1046 BCE). By the time of the Eastern Han dynasty (25–220 CE) these early glazed ceramic wares had developed into porcelain, which Chinese defined as high-fired ware. By the late Sui dynasty (581–618 CE) and early Tang dynasty (618–907 CE), the now-standard requirements of whiteness and translucency had been achieved, in types such as Ding ware. The wares were already exported to the Islamic world, where they were highly prized.

Eventually, porcelain and the expertise required to create it began to spread into other areas of East Asia. During the Song dynasty (960–1279 CE), artistry and production had reached new heights. The manufacture of porcelain became highly organised, and the dragon kilns excavated from this period could fire as many as 25,000 pieces at a time, and over 100,000 by the end of the period. While Xing ware is regarded as among the greatest of the Tang dynasty porcelain, Ding ware became the premier porcelain of the Song dynasty. By the Ming dynasty, production of the finest wares for the court was concentrated in a single city, and Jingdezhen porcelain, originally owned by the imperial government, remains the centre of Chinese porcelain production.

By the time of the Ming dynasty (1368–1644 CE), porcelain wares were being exported to Asia and Europe. Some of the most well-known Chinese porcelain art styles arrived in Europe during this era, such as the coveted "blue-and-white" wares. The Ming dynasty controlled much of the porcelain trade, which was expanded to Asia, Africa and Europe via the Silk Road. In 1517, Portuguese merchants began direct trade by sea with the Ming dynasty, and in 1598, Dutch merchants followed.

Some porcelains were more highly valued than others in imperial China. The most valued types can be identified by their association with the court, either as tribute offerings, or as products of kilns under imperial supervision. Since the Yuan dynasty, the largest and best centre of production has made Jingdezhen porcelain. During the Ming dynasty, Jingdezhen porcelain had become a source of imperial pride. The Yongle emperor erected a white porcelain brick-faced pagoda at Nanjing, and an exceptionally smoothly glazed type of white porcelain is peculiar to his reign. Jingdezhen porcelain's fame came to a peak during the Qing dynasty.

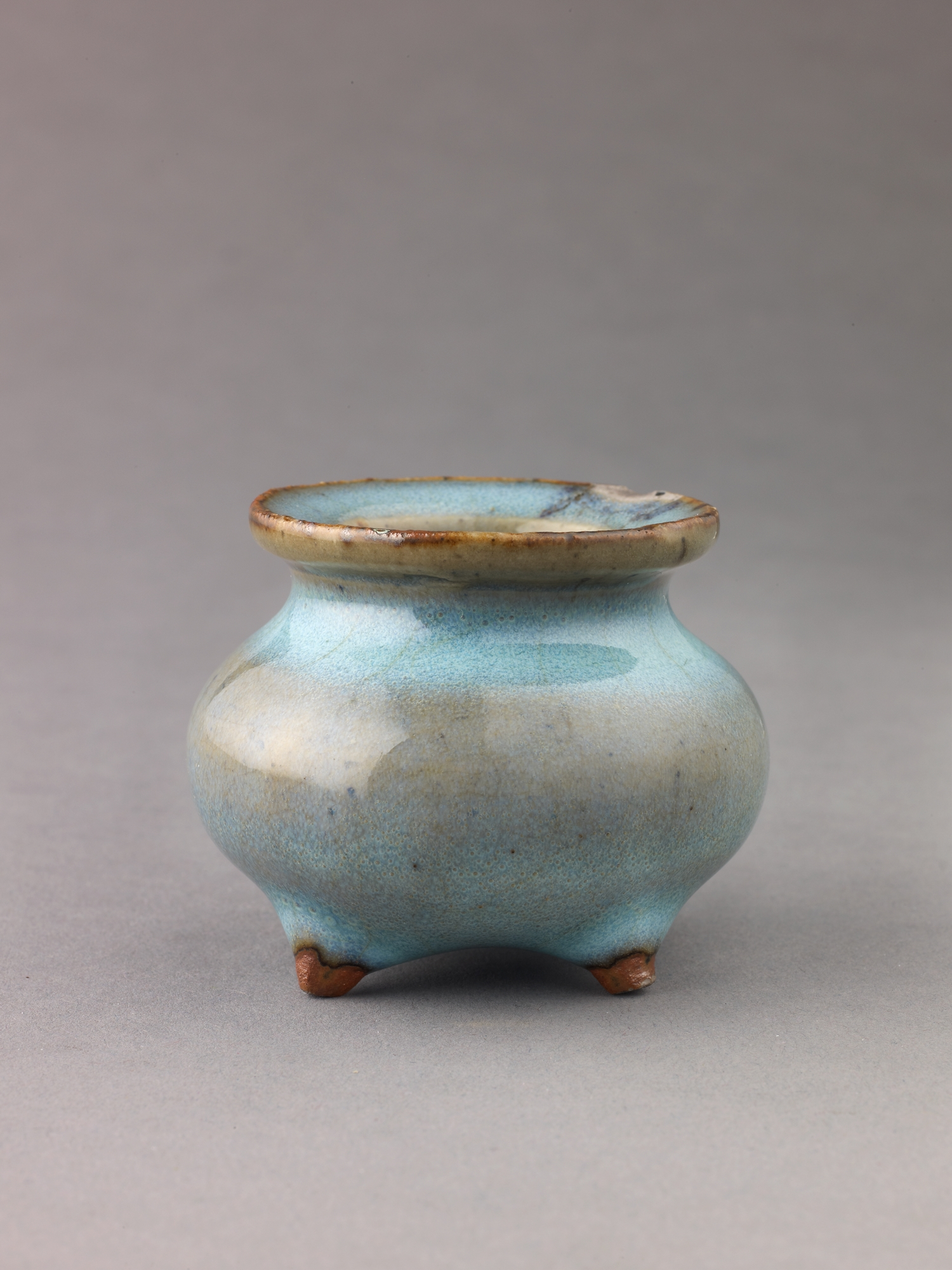
Jun ware miniature incense burner with blue glaze, Song–Yuan dynasty (12th–14th century). Metropolitan Museum of Art.

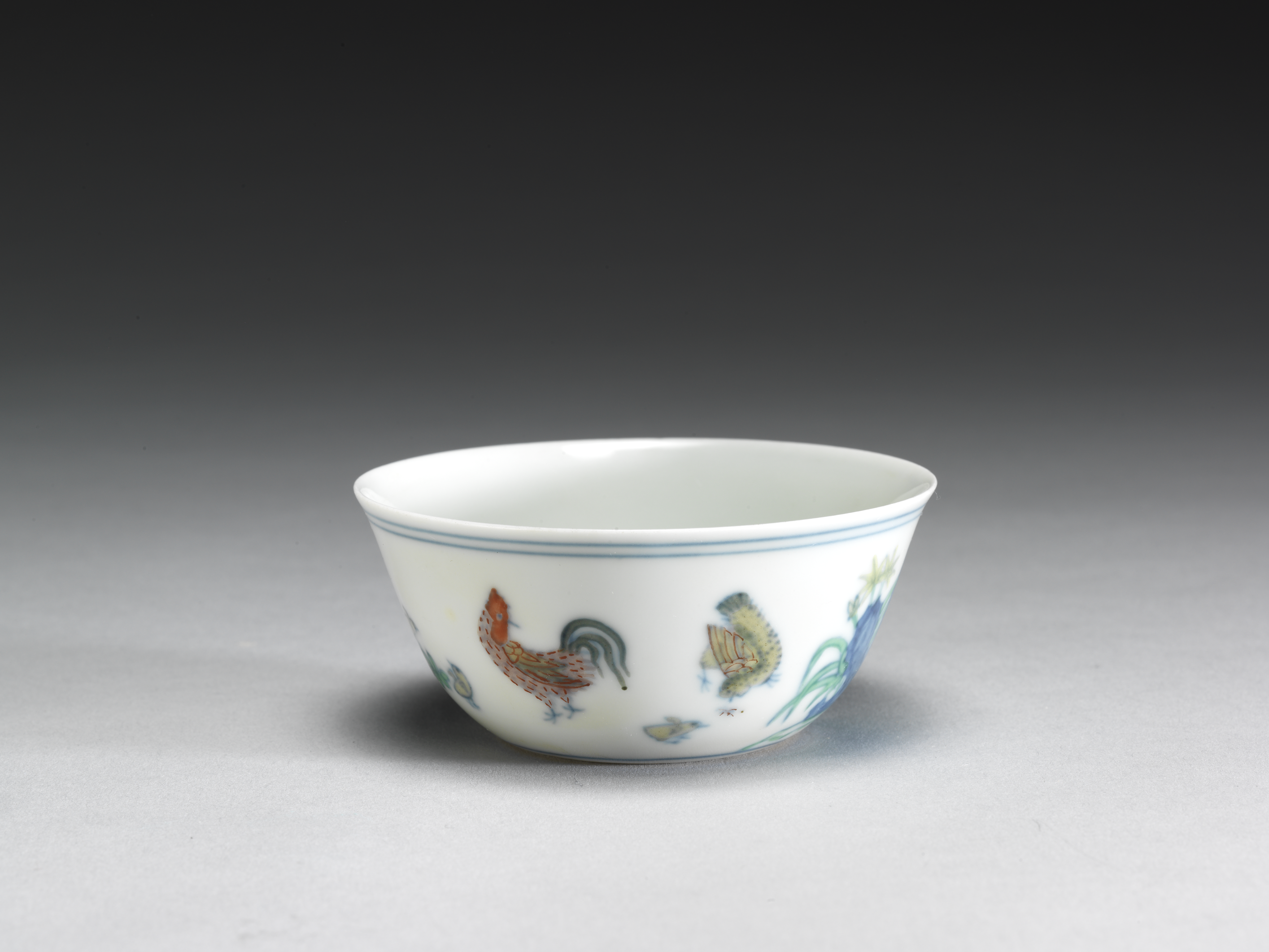
Doucai Chicken Cup (Chenghua), Ming, 1465–1487 CE

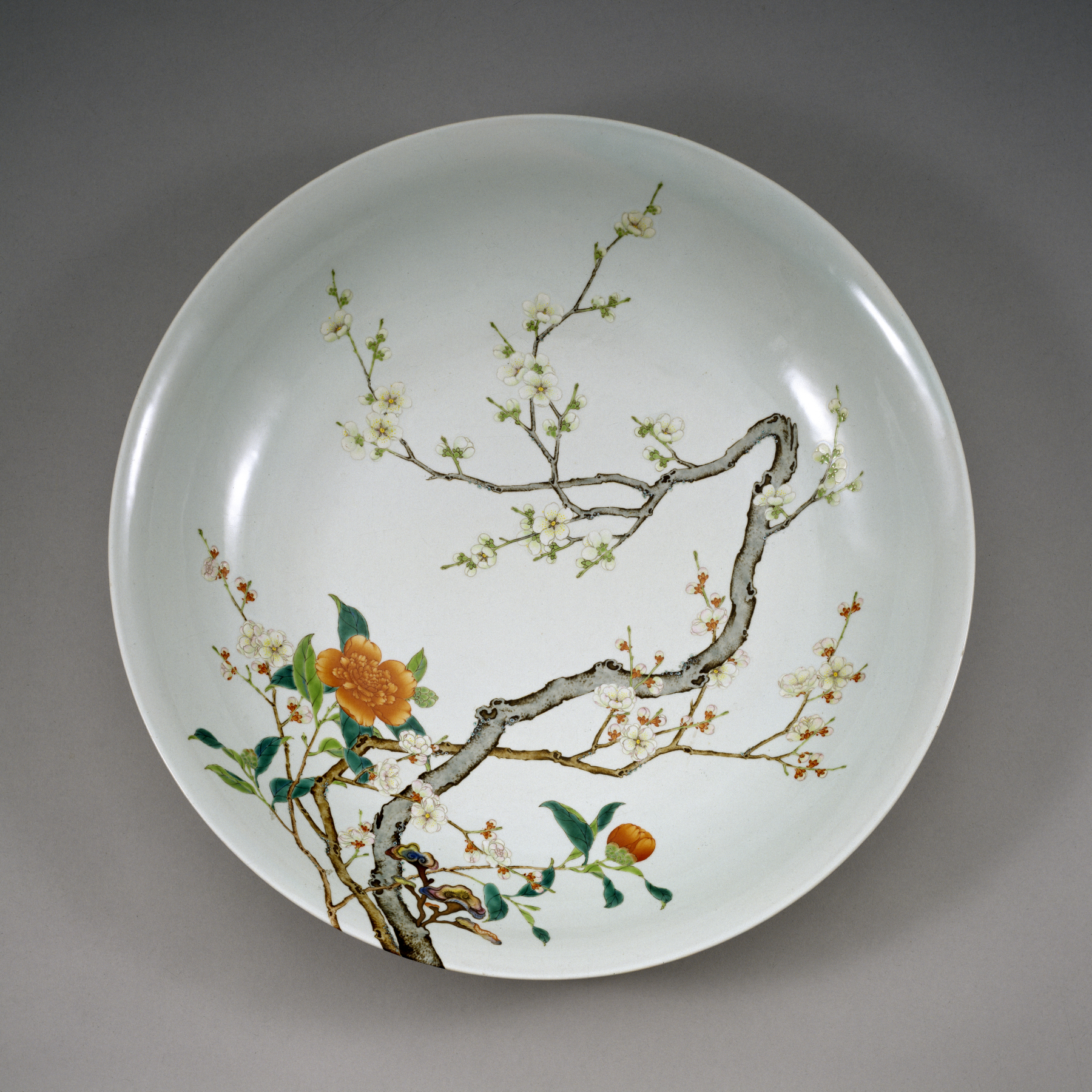
Jingdezhen imperial famille rose dish, Qing dynasty, Yongzheng period (1723–1735). Walters Art Museum.

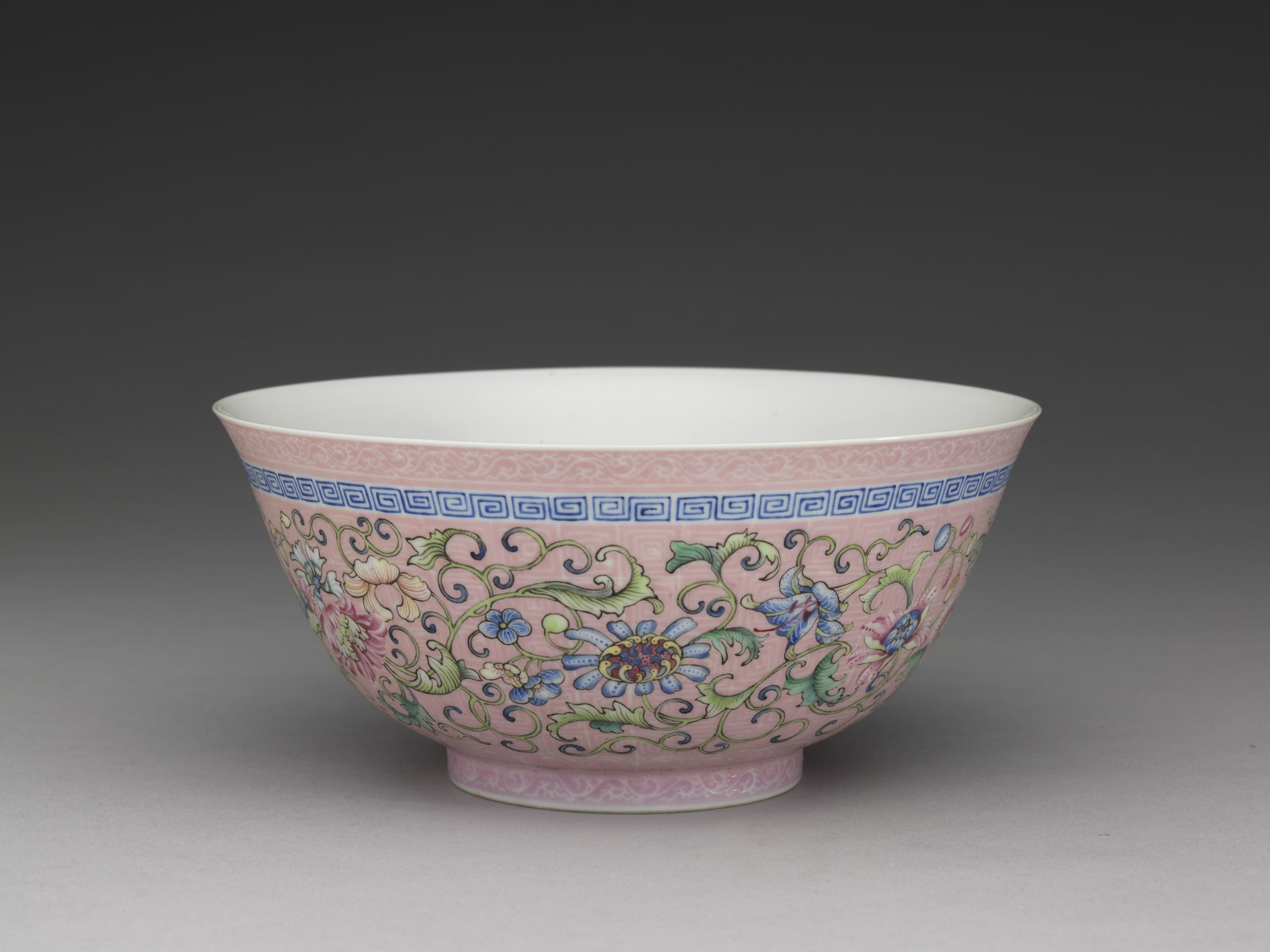
Famille rose bowl with lotus design on pink ground, Qing dynasty, Qianlong period (1736–1795). National Palace Museum, Taipei.

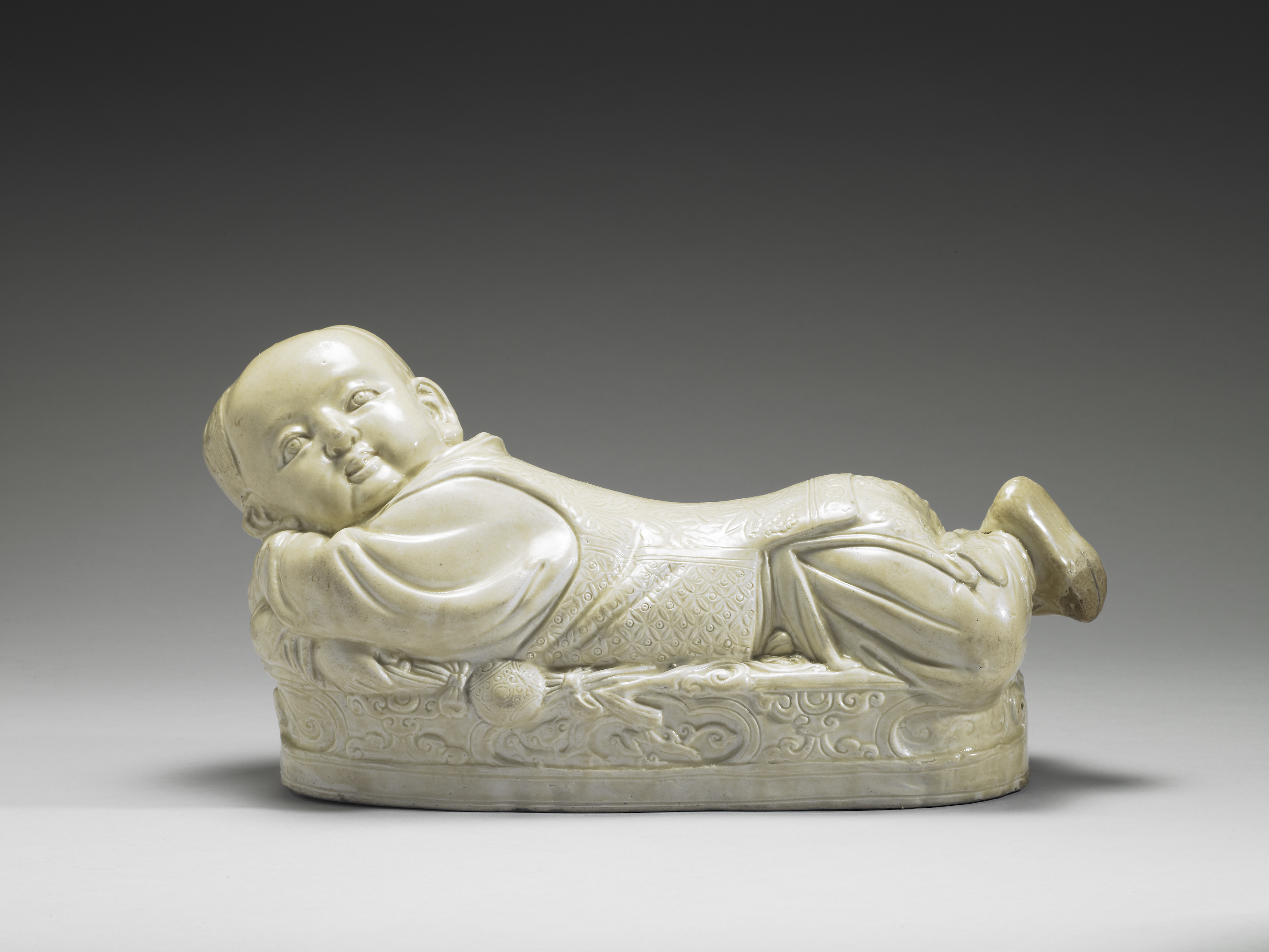
Ding ware pillow in the shape of a recumbent child, Northern Song dynasty (12th century). National Palace Museum, Taipei.

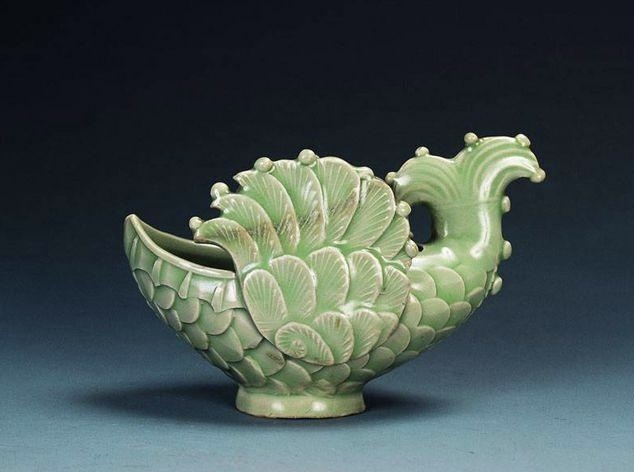
Yaozhou ware sky-blue glazed water dropper in the shape of a flying fish, Five Dynasties period (907–960). Liaoning Provincial Museum.

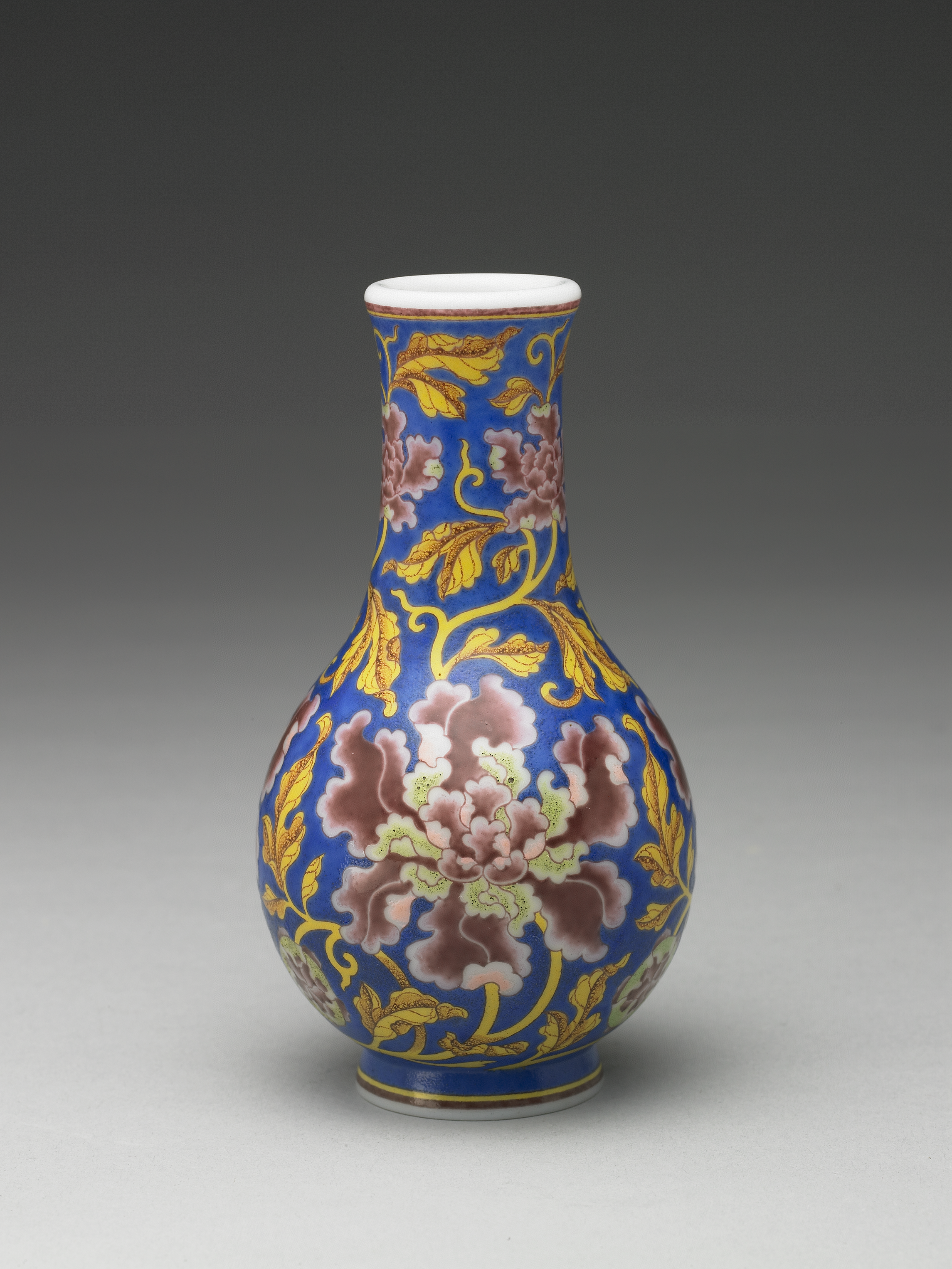
Gallbladder-shaped vase decorated with peony on a blue ground in painted enamels, Qing dynasty, Kangxi period (1662–1722). National Palace Museum.

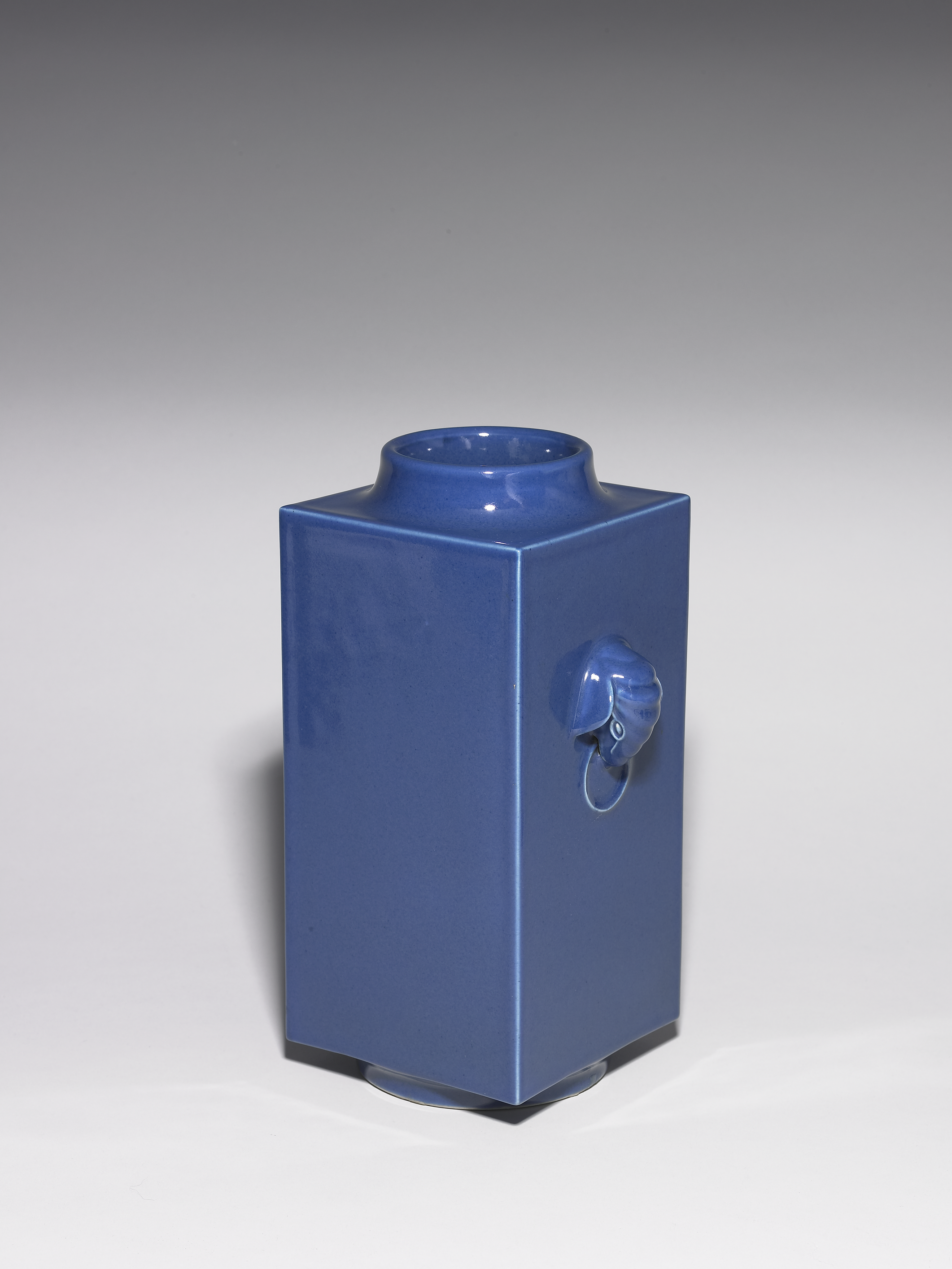
Cobalt blue glazed cong-shaped vase, Qing dynasty. National Palace Museum.

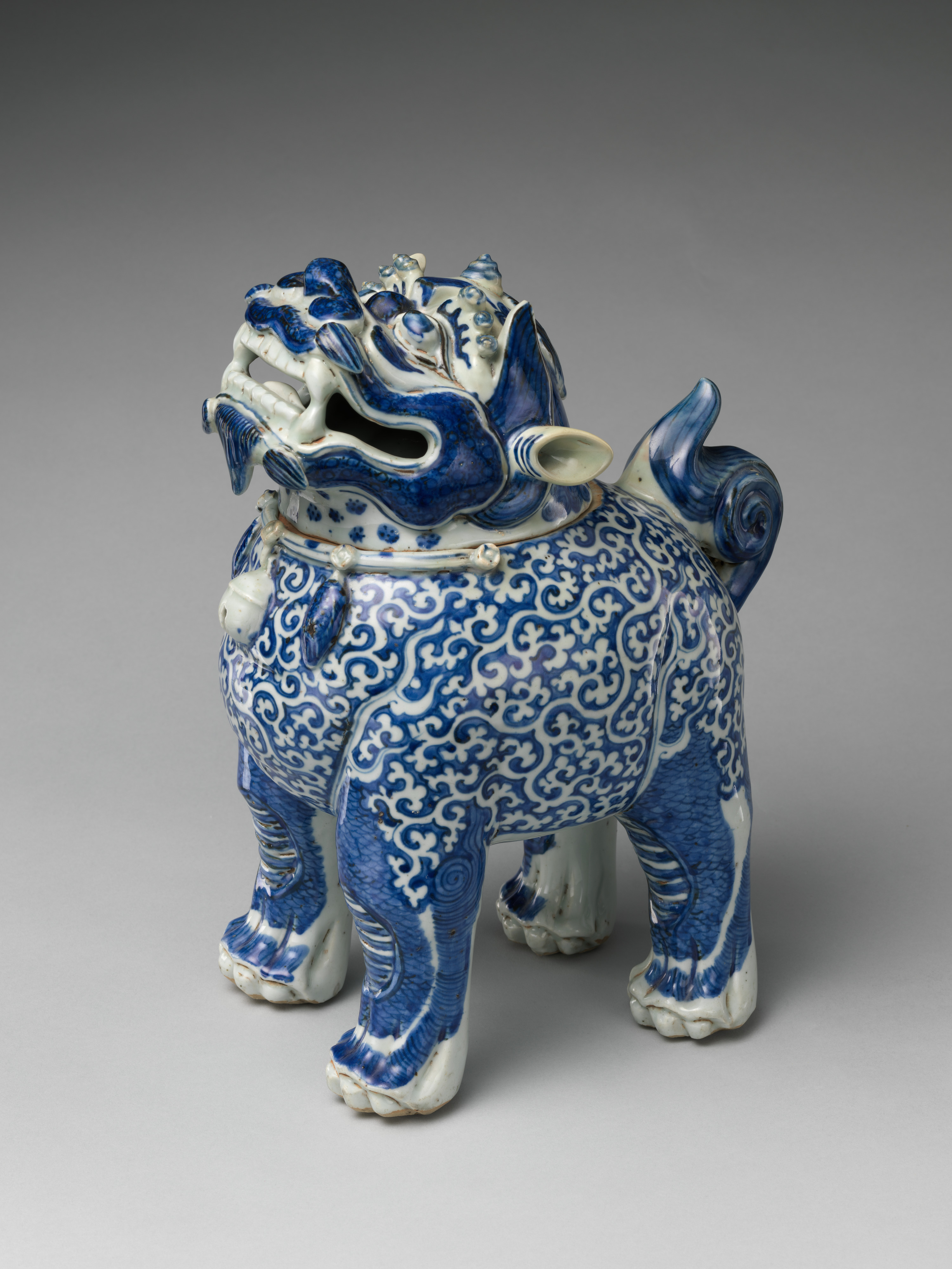
Jingdezhen blue and white censer in the form of a mythical beast, Ming dynasty (early 17th century). Metropolitan Museum of Art.

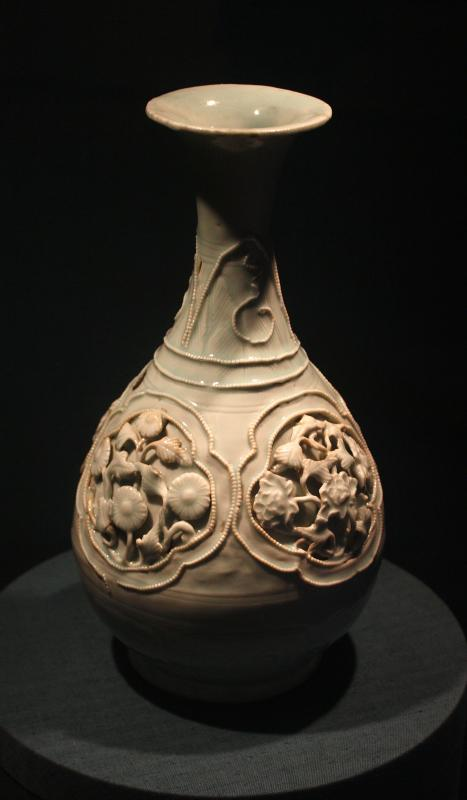
The Fonthill Vase is the earliest Chinese porcelain object to have reached Europe. It was a Chinese gift for Louis the Great of Hungary in 1338.

=== Japanese porcelain ===
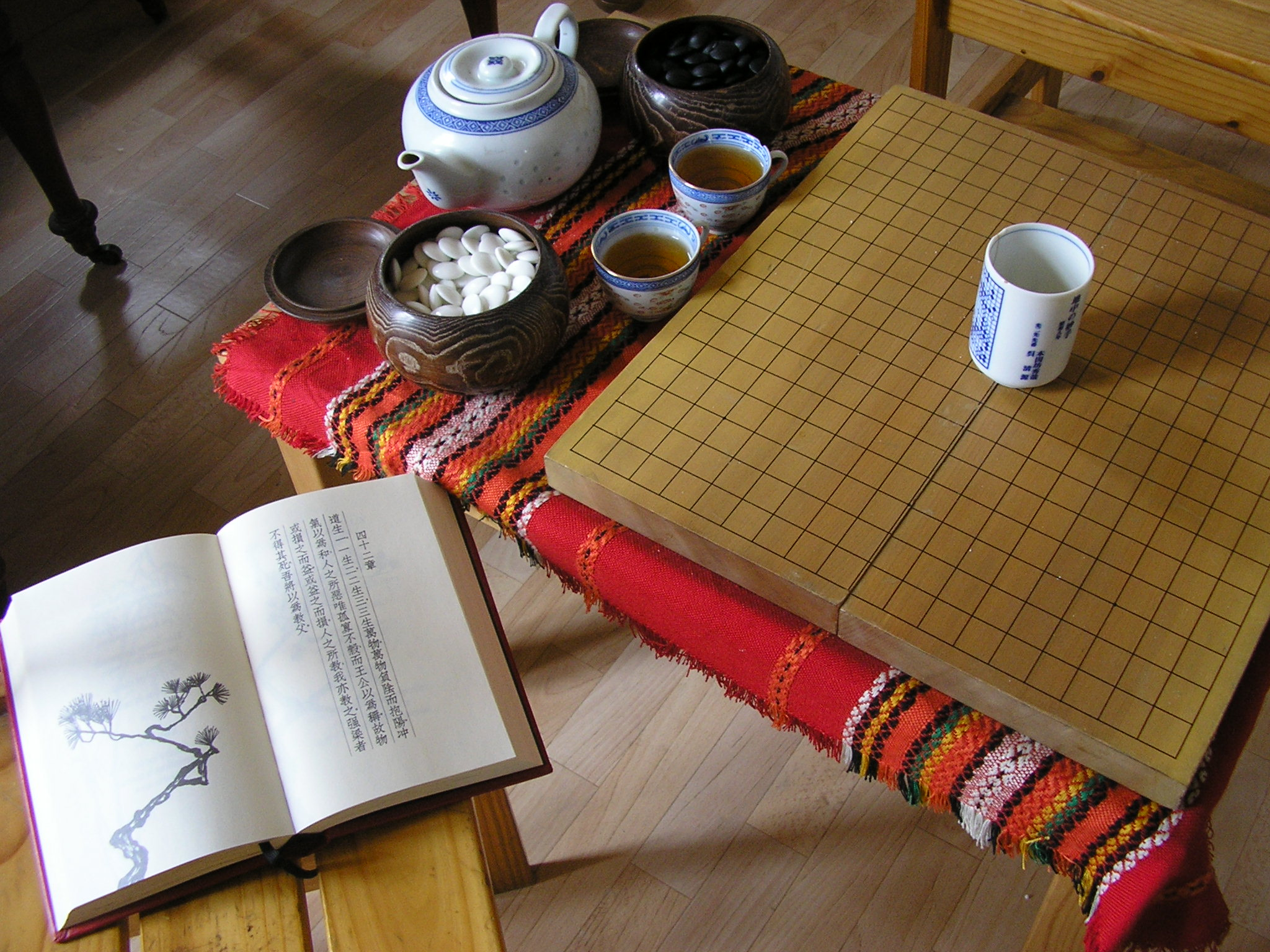
A contemporary Japanese porcelain goblet (in the middle of the Go board) and a Chinese teapot and its cups (on the side)

Although the Japanese elite were keen importers of Chinese porcelain from early on, they were not able to make their own until the arrival of Korean potters that were taken captive during the Japanese invasions of Korea (1592–1598). They brought an improved type of kiln, and one of them spotted a source of porcelain clay near Arita, and before long several kilns had started in the region. At first their wares were similar to the cheaper and cruder Chinese porcelains with underglaze blue decoration that were already widely sold in Japan; this style was to continue for cheaper everyday wares until the 20th century.

Exports to Europe began around 1660, through the Chinese and the Dutch East India Company, the only Europeans allowed a trading presence. Chinese exports had been seriously disrupted by civil wars as the Ming dynasty fell apart, and the Japanese exports increased rapidly to fill the gap. At first the wares used European shapes and mostly Chinese decoration, as the Chinese had done, but gradually original Japanese styles developed.

Nabeshima ware was produced in kilns owned by the families of feudal lords, and were decorated in the Japanese tradition, much of it related to textile design. This was not initially exported, but used for gifts to other aristocratic families. Imari ware and Kakiemon are broad terms for styles of export porcelain with overglaze "enamelled" decoration begun in the early period, both with many sub-types.

A great range of styles and manufacturing centres were in use by the start of the 19th century, and as Japan opened to trade in the second half, exports expanded hugely and quality generally declined. Much traditional porcelain continues to replicate older methods of production and styles, and there are several modern industrial manufacturers. By the early 1900s, Filipino porcelain artisans working in Japanese porcelain centres for much of their lives, later on introduced the craft into the native population in the Philippines, although oral literature from Cebu in the central Philippines have noted that porcelain were already being produced by the natives locally during the time of Cebu's early rulers, prior to the arrival of colonizers in the 16th century.

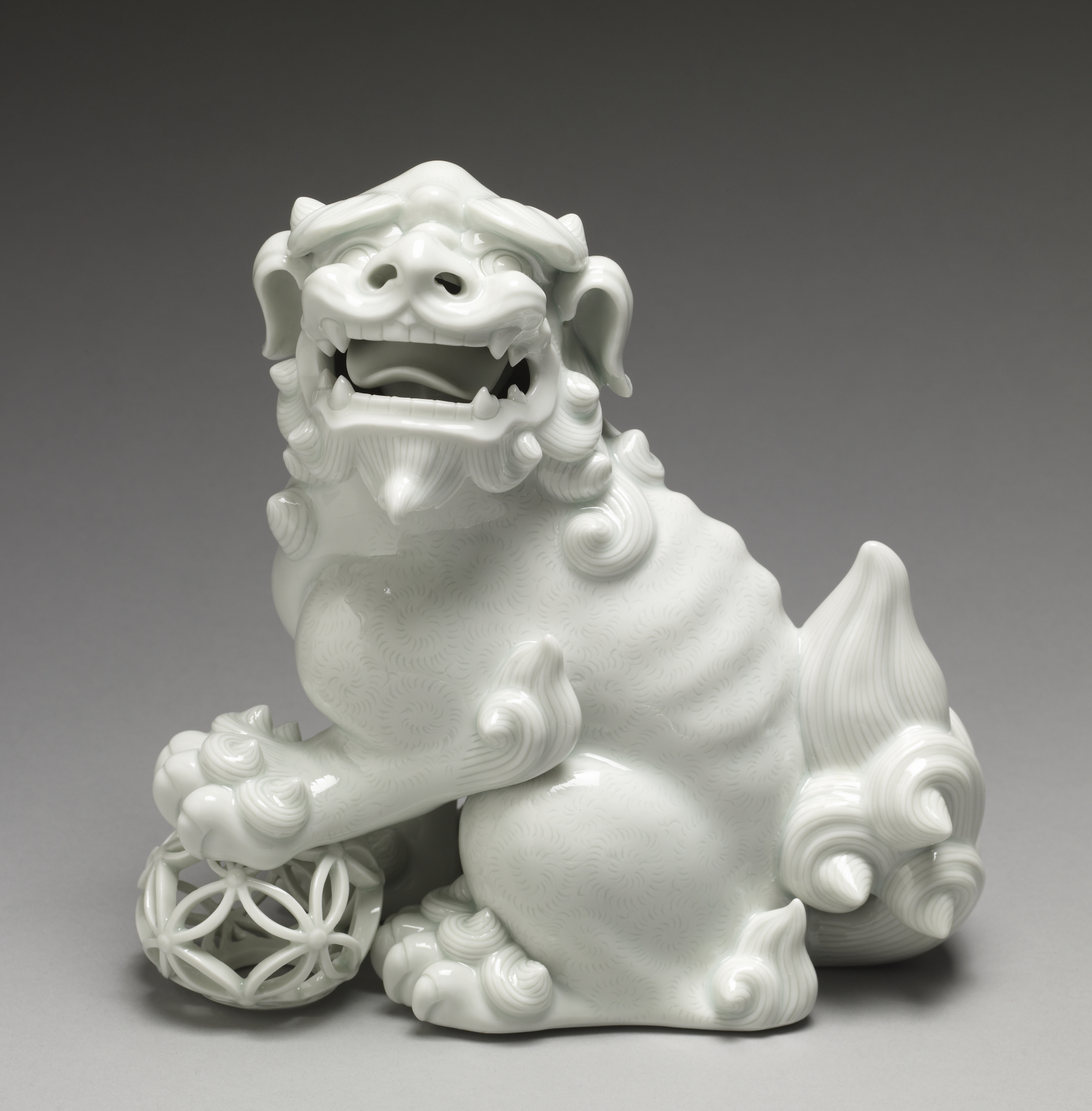
Hirado ware okimono (figurine) of a lion with a ball, Japan, 19th century

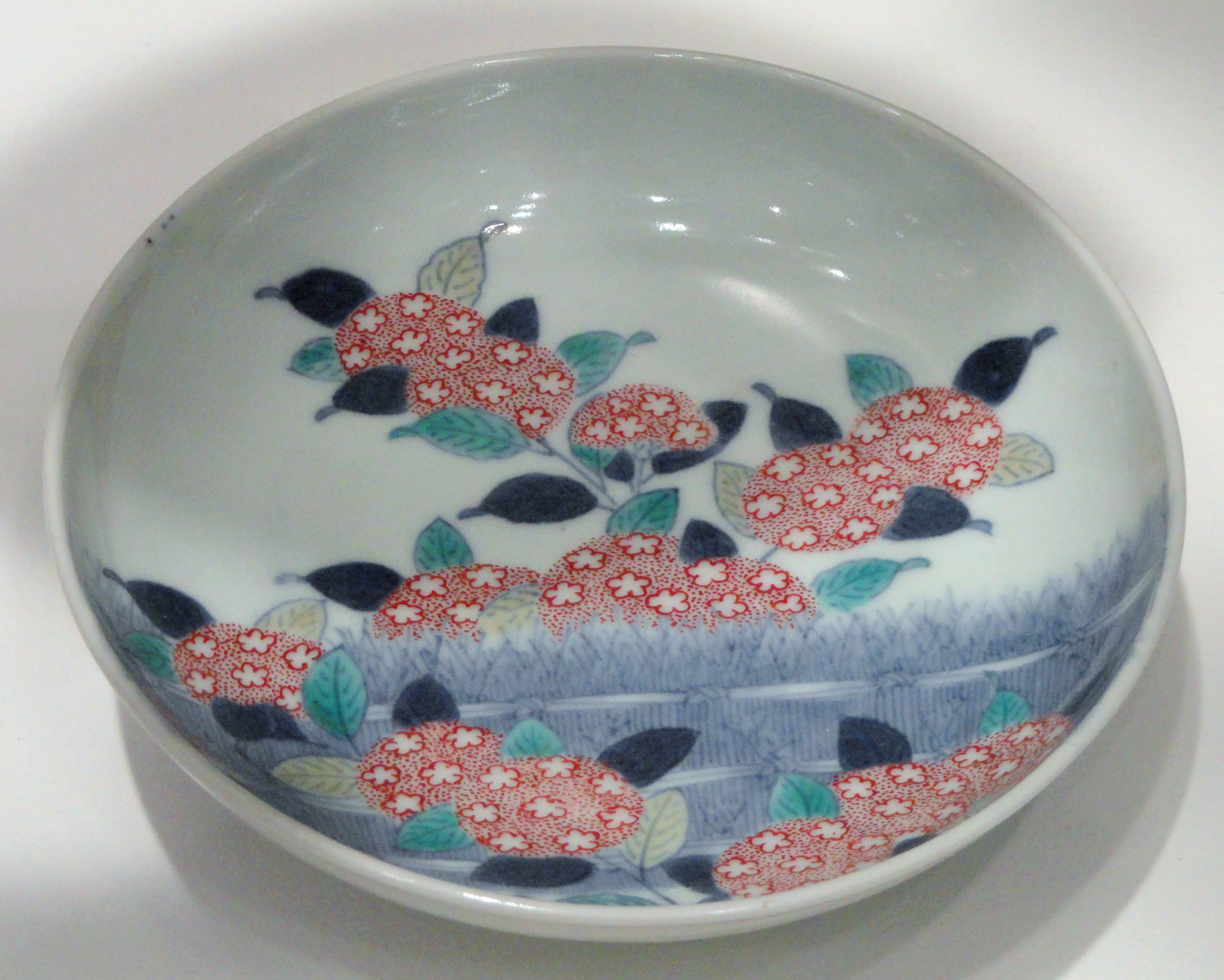
Nabeshima ware dish with hydrangeas, c. 1680–1720, Arita, Okawachi kilns, hard-paste porcelain with cobalt and enamels

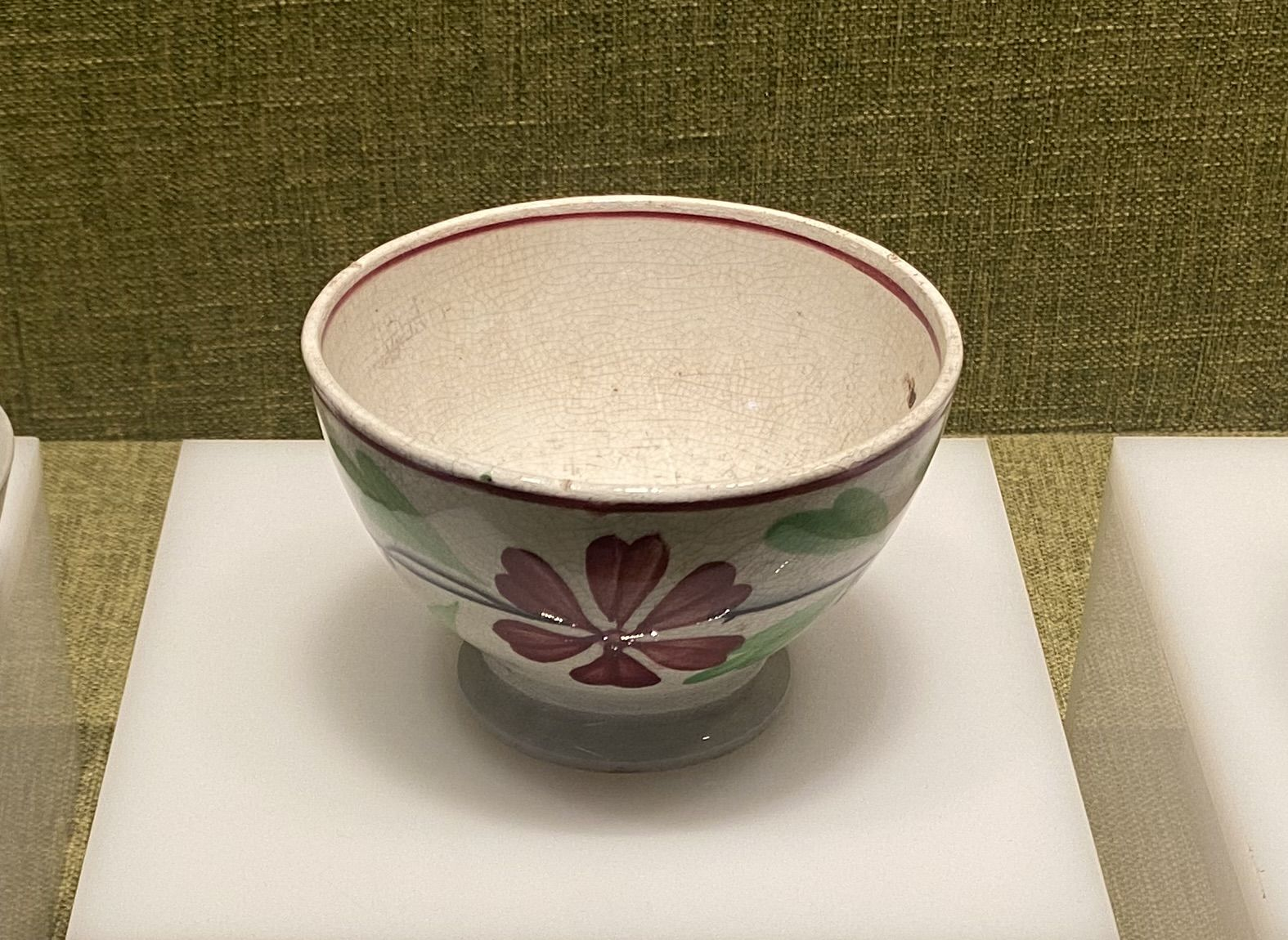
Japanese doucai-style bowl with floral design and tall foot ring, modern period.

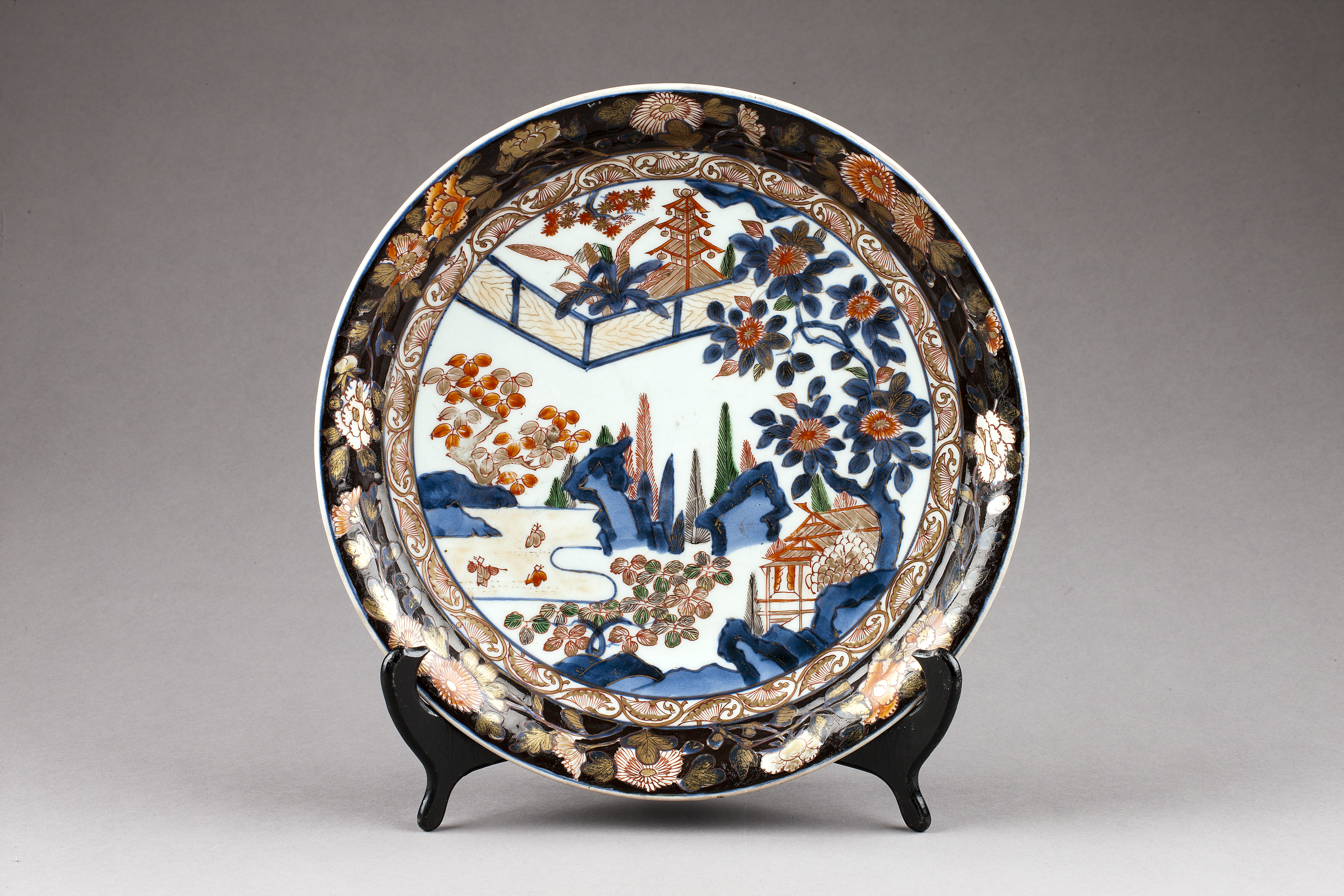
Japanese Imari ware dish with landscape, figures, and floral decoration in underglaze blue, iron-red, and gold, early 18th century. Hallwyl Museum, Stockholm.

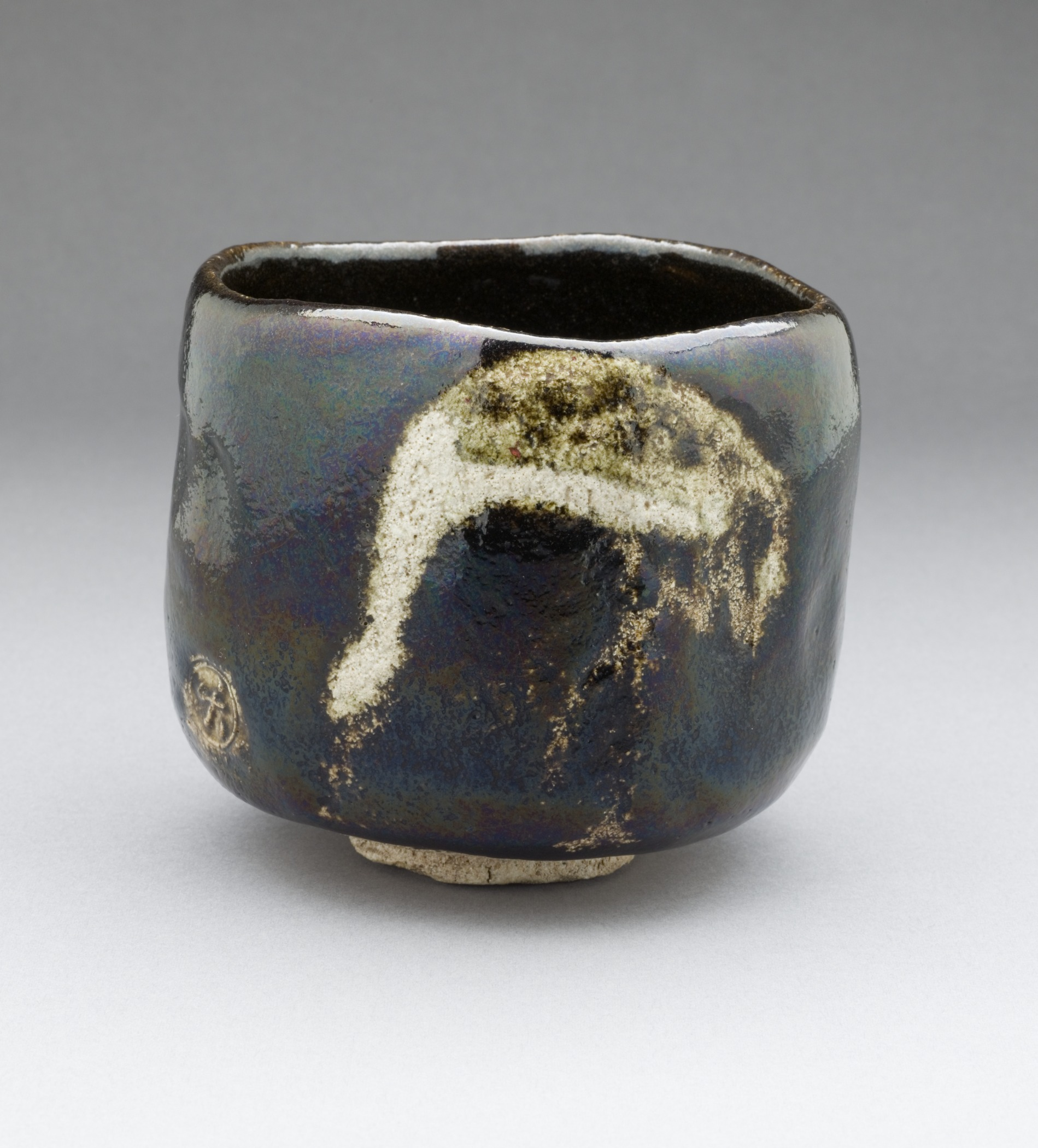
Black Raku tea bowl "Shōrei" (Aged Pine) with crane design, by Raku IX (Ryōnyū), Edo period (c. 1810–1838). Los Angeles County Museum of Art.

=== Korean porcelain ===
Olive green glaze was introduced in the late Silla Dynasty. Most ceramics from Silla are generally leaf-shaped, which is a very common shape in Korea. Korean celadon comes in a variety of colors, from turquoise to putty. Additionally, in the late 13th century, the inlay technique of expressing pigmented patterns by filling the hollow parts of pottery with white and red clay was frequently used. The main difference from those in China is that many specimens have inlay decoration under the glaze.

Most Korean ceramics from the Joseon Dynasty are of excellent decorative quality. It usually has a melon shape and is asymmetrical.

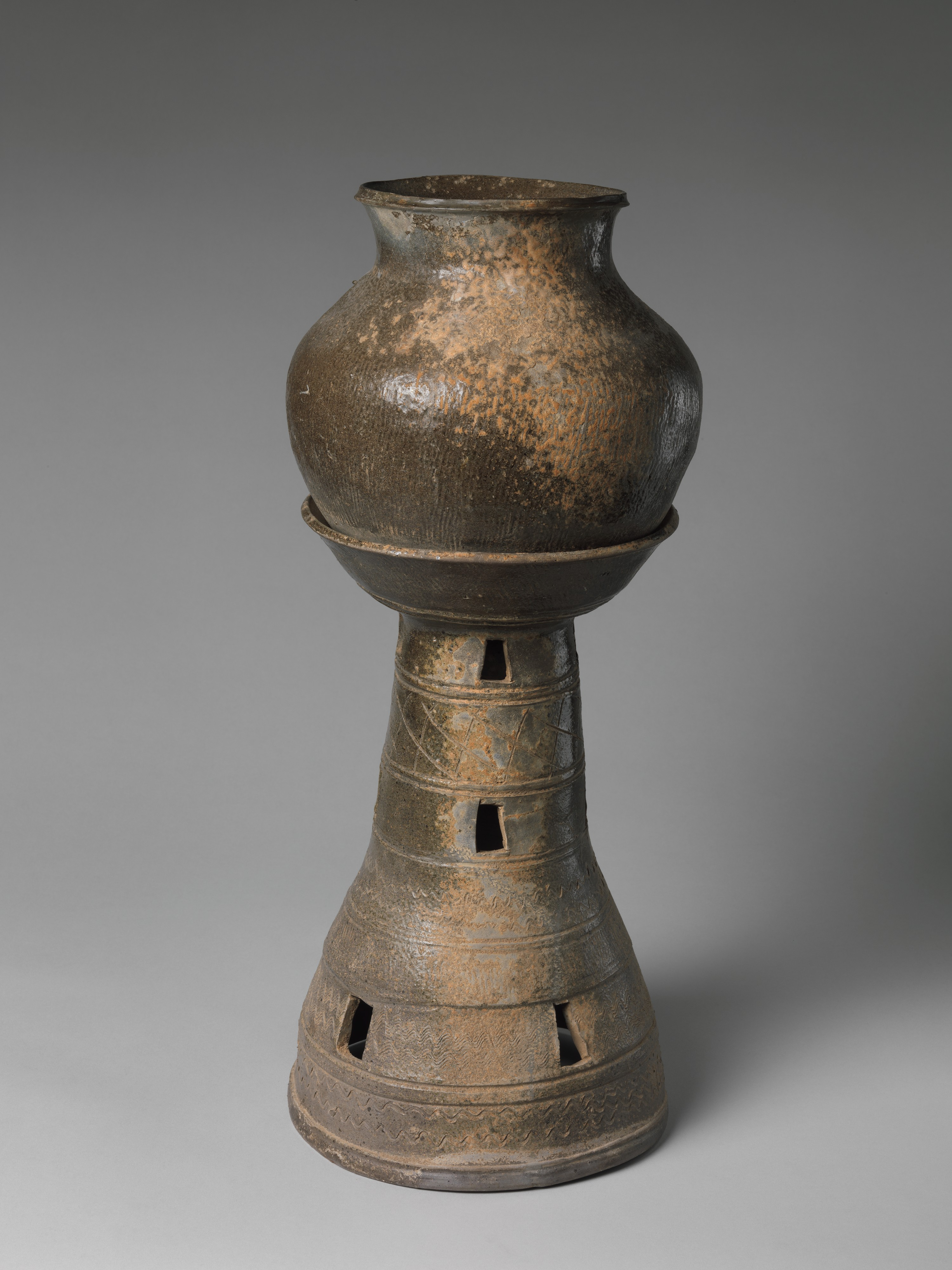
Jar and tall stand with perforated base (in Silla)

Goryeo ware

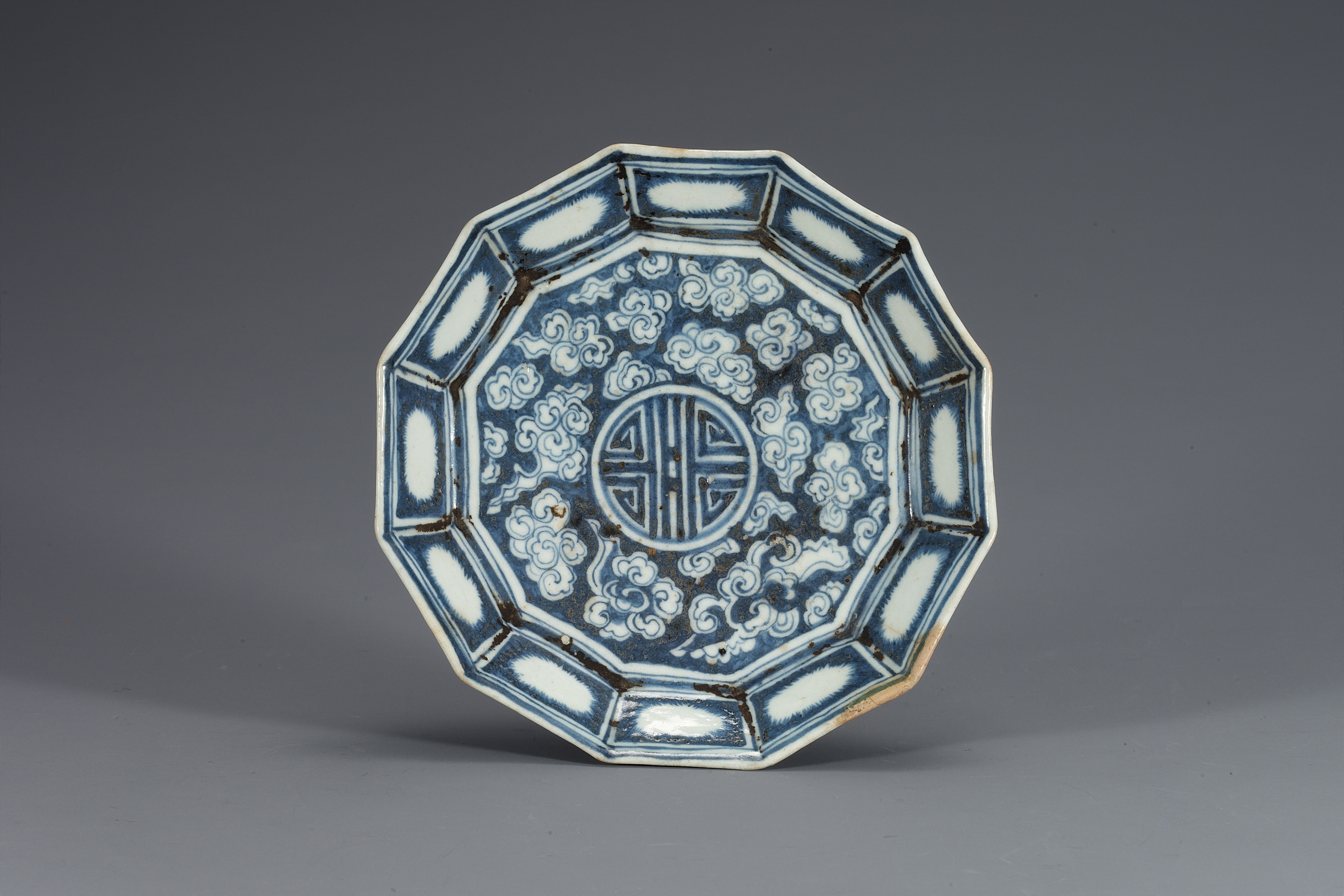
Korean blue and white porcelain dish with twelve-sided (dodecagonal) rim, Joseon dynasty. National Museum of Korea.

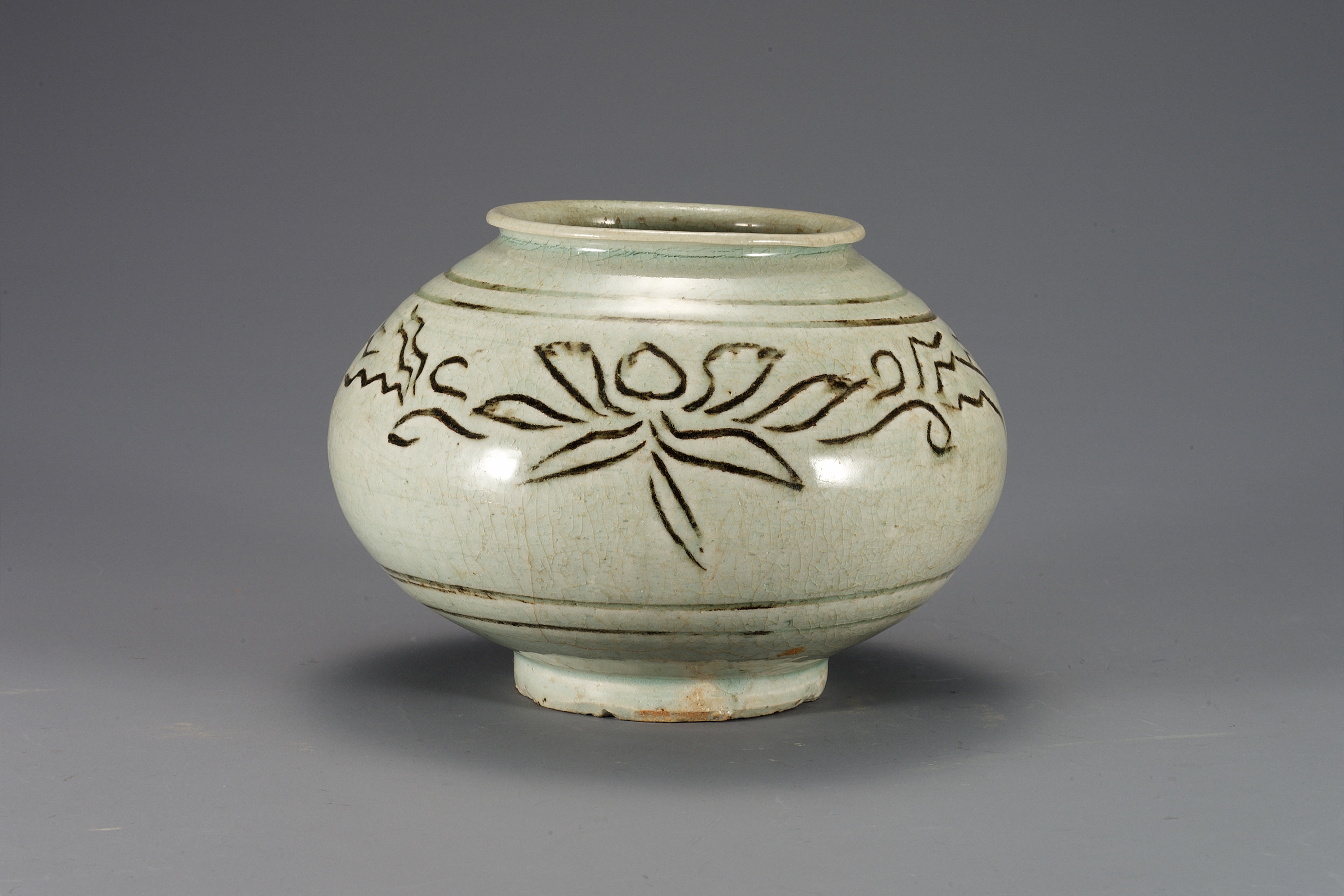
Korean buncheong ware jar with inlaid (sanggam) peony and scroll motif, Joseon dynasty (15th–16th century). National Museum of Korea, Seoul.

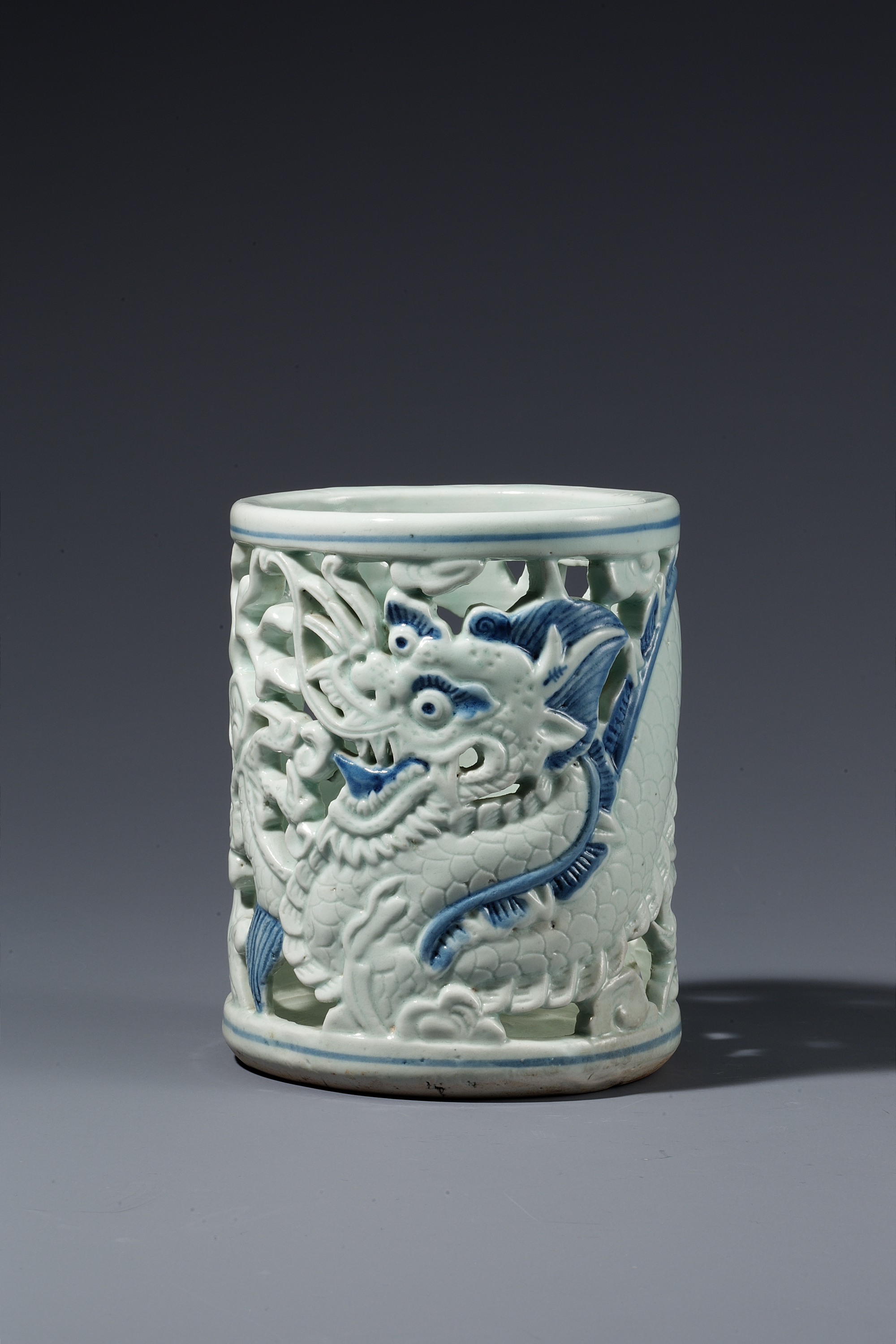
Korean blue and white porcelain brush holder with openwork cloud and dragon design, Joseon dynasty. National Museum of Korea.

=== European porcelain ===
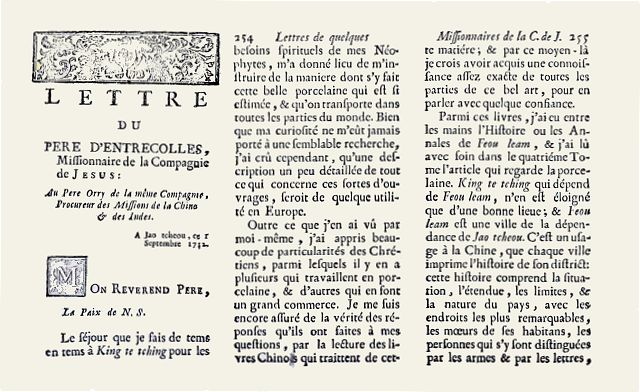
Section of a letter from François Xavier d'Entrecolles about Chinese porcelain manufacturing techniques, 1712, re-published by Jean-Baptiste Du Halde in 1735

Imported Chinese porcelains were held in such great esteem in Europe that in English china became a commonly used synonym for the Italian-derived porcelain. The first mention of porcelain in Europe is in Il Milione by Marco Polo in the 13th century. Apart from copying Chinese porcelain in faience (tin glazed earthenware), the soft-paste Medici porcelain in 16th-century Florence was the first real European attempt to reproduce it, with little success.

Early in the 16th century, Portuguese traders returned home with samples of kaolin, which they discovered in China to be essential in the production of porcelain wares. However, the Chinese techniques and composition used to manufacture porcelain were not yet fully understood. Countless experiments to produce porcelain had unpredictable results and met with failure. In the German state of Saxony, the search concluded in 1708 when Ehrenfried Walther von Tschirnhaus produced a hard, white, translucent type of porcelain specimen with a combination of ingredients, including kaolin and alabaster, mined from a Saxon mine in Colditz. It was a closely guarded trade secret of the Saxon enterprise.

In 1712, many of the elaborate Chinese porcelain manufacturing secrets were revealed throughout Europe by the French Jesuit father Francois Xavier d'Entrecolles and soon published in the Lettres édifiantes et curieuses de Chine par des missionnaires jésuites. The secrets, which d'Entrecolles read about and witnessed in China, were now known and began seeing use in Europe.

==== Meissen ====
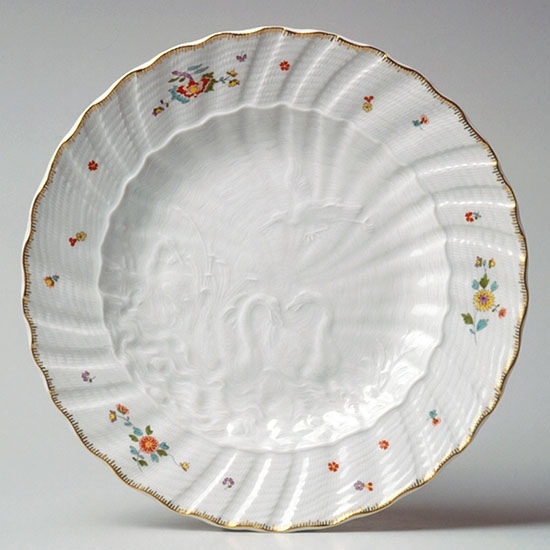
Meissen plate from the famous Swan Service made for Count Brühl, minister to king Augustus III of Poland, 1737-1742

Von Tschirnhaus along with Johann Friedrich Böttger were employed by Augustus II, King of Poland and Elector of Saxony, who sponsored their work in Dresden and in the town of Meissen. Tschirnhaus had a wide knowledge of science and had been involved in the European quest to perfect porcelain manufacture when, in 1705, Böttger was appointed to assist him in this task. Böttger had originally been trained as a pharmacist; after he turned to alchemical research, he claimed to have known the secret of transmuting dross into gold, which attracted the attention of Augustus. Imprisoned by Augustus as an incentive to hasten his research, Böttger was obliged to work with other alchemists in the futile search for transmutation and was eventually assigned to assist Tschirnhaus. One of the first results of the collaboration between the two was the development of a red stoneware that resembled that of Yixing.

A workshop note records that the first specimen of hard, white and vitrified European porcelain was produced in 1708. At the time, the research was still being supervised by Tschirnhaus; however, he died in October of that year. It was left to Böttger to report to Augustus in March 1709 that he could make porcelain. For this reason, credit for the European discovery of porcelain is traditionally ascribed to him rather than Tschirnhaus.

The Meissen factory was established in 1710 after the development of a kiln and a glaze suitable for use with Böttger's porcelain, which required firing at temperatures of up to 1,400 °C (2,552 °F) to achieve translucence. Meissen porcelain was once-fired, or green-fired. It was noted for its great resistance to thermal shock; a visitor to the factory in Böttger's time reported having seen a white-hot teapot being removed from the kiln and dropped into cold water without damage. Although widely disbelieved this has been replicated in modern times.

==== Russian porcelain ====
In 1744, Elizabeth of Russia signed an agreement to establish the first porcelain manufactory; previously it had to be imported. The technology of making "white gold" was carefully hidden by its creators. Peter the Great had tried to reveal the "big porcelain secret", and sent an agent to the Meissen factory, and finally hired a porcelain master from abroad. This relied on the research of the Russian scientist Dmitry Ivanovich Vinogradov. His development of porcelain manufacturing technology was not based on secrets learned through third parties, but was the result of painstaking work and careful analysis. Thanks to this, by 1760, Imperial Porcelain Factory, Saint Petersburg became a major European factories producing tableware, and later porcelain figurines. Eventually other factories opened: Gardner porcelain, Dulyovo (1832), Kuznetsovsky porcelain, Popovsky porcelain, and Gzhel.

During the twentieth century, under Soviet governments, ceramics continued to be a popular artform, supported by the state, with an increasingly propagandist role. One artist, who worked at the Baranovsky Porcelain Factory and at the Experimental Ceramic and Artistic Plant in Kyiv, was Oksana Zhnikrup, whose porcelain figures of the ballet and the circus were widely known.

==== Soft paste porcelain ====
The pastes produced by combining clay and powdered glass (frit) were called Frittenporzellan in Germany and frita in Spain. In France they were known as pâte tendre and in England as "soft-paste". They appear to have been given this name because they do not easily retain their shape in the wet state, or because they tend to slump in the kiln under high temperature, or because the body and the glaze can be easily scratched.

===== France =====
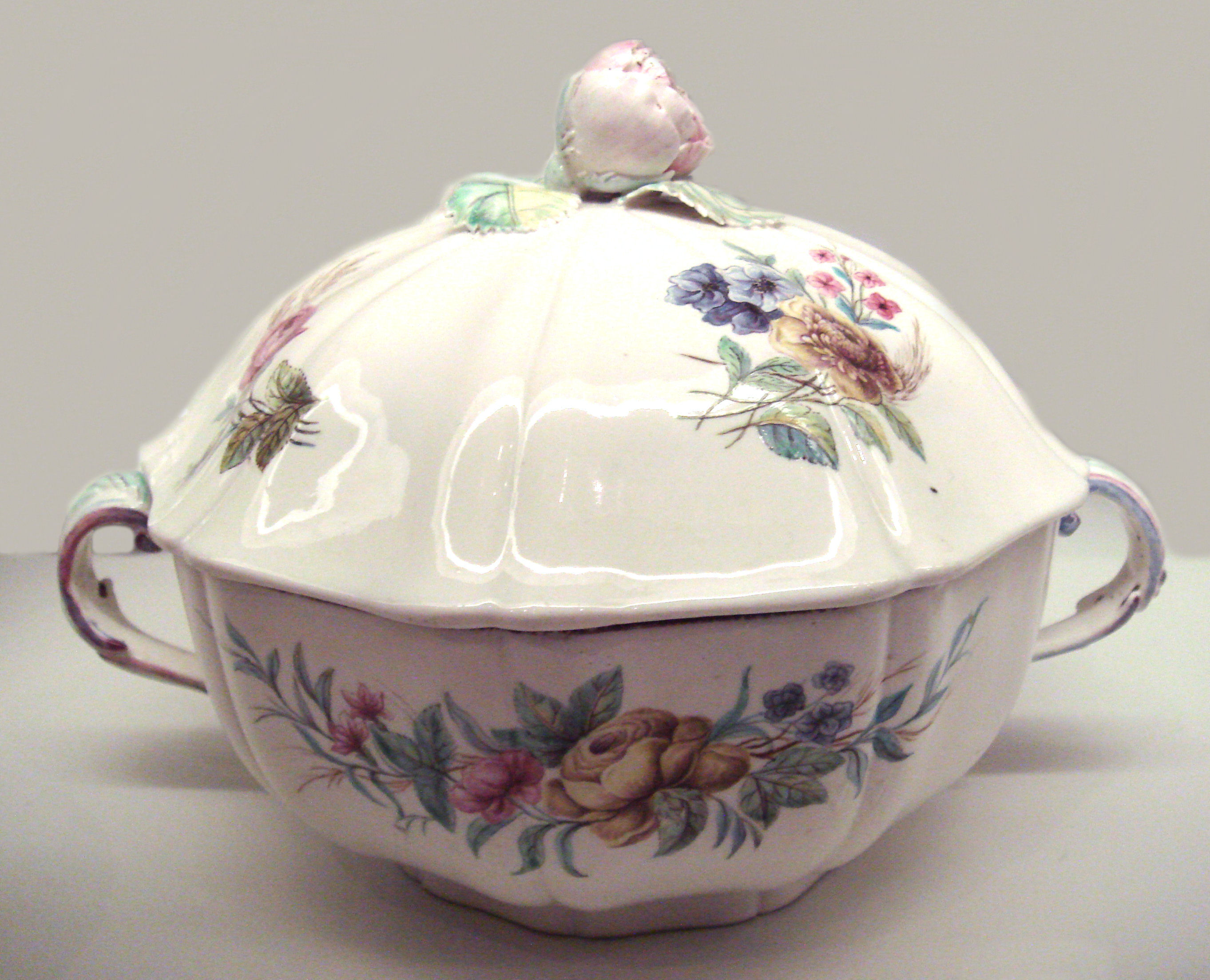
Chantilly porcelain, soft-paste, 1750-1760

Experiments at Rouen produced the earliest soft-paste in France, but the first important French soft-paste porcelain was made at the Saint-Cloud factory before 1702. Soft-paste factories were established with the Chantilly manufactory in 1730 and at Mennecy in 1750. The Vincennes porcelain factory was established in 1740, moving to larger premises at Sèvres in 1756. Vincennes soft-paste was whiter and freer of imperfections than any of its French rivals, which put Vincennes/Sèvres porcelain in the leading position in France and throughout the whole of Europe in the second half of the 18th century.

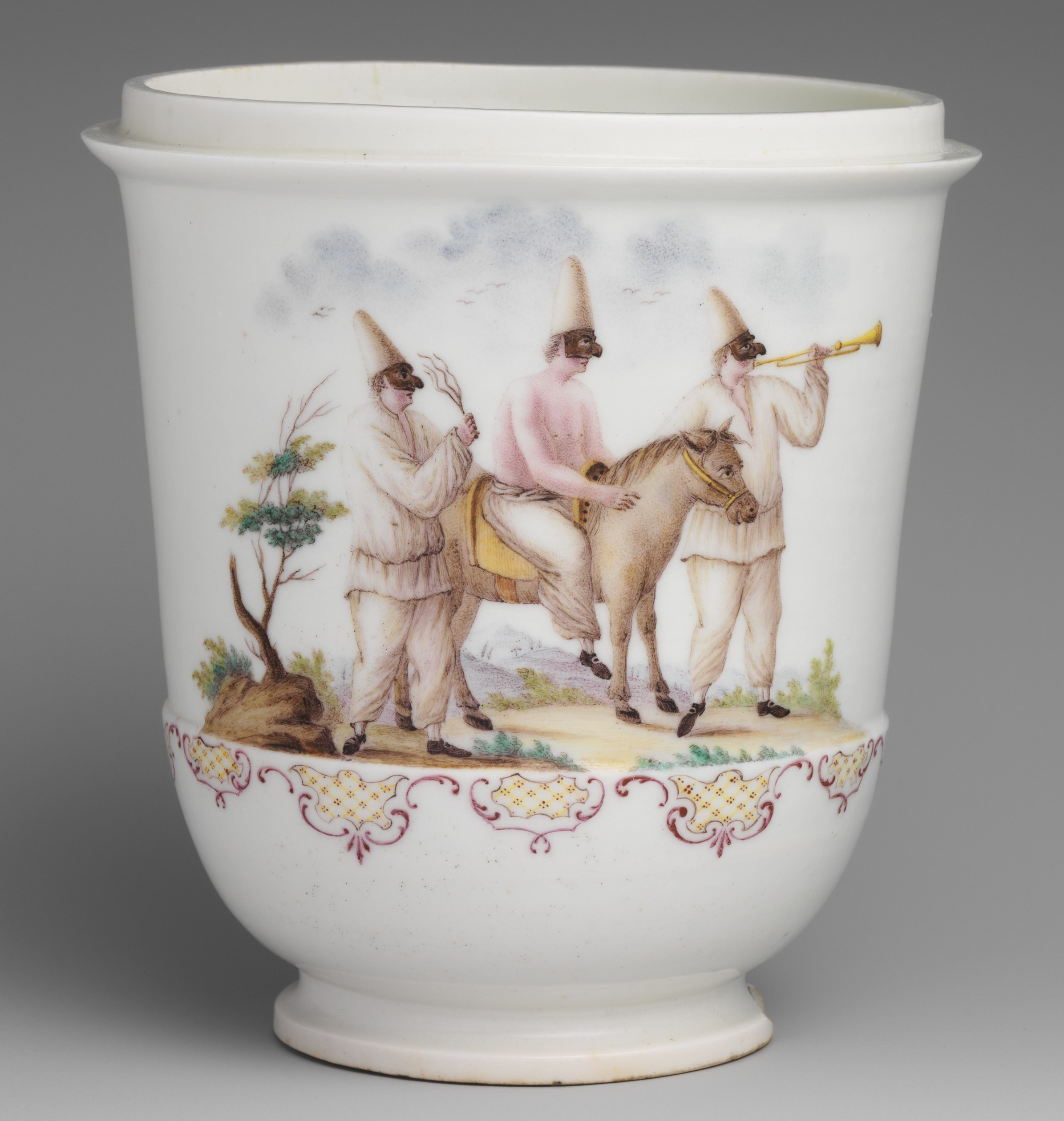
Capodimonte porcelain jar with three figures of Pulcinella from the commedia dell'arte, soft-paste, 1745–50.

===== Italy =====
Doccia porcelain of Florence was founded in 1735 and remains in production, unlike Capodimonte porcelain which was moved from Naples to Madrid by its royal owner, after producing from 1743 to 1759. After a gap of 15 years Naples porcelain was produced from 1771 to 1806, specializing in Neoclassical styles. All these were very successful, with large outputs of high-quality wares. In and around Venice, Francesco Vezzi was producing hard-paste from around 1720 to 1735; survivals of Vezzi porcelain are very rare, but less so than from the Hewelke factory, which only lasted from 1758 to 1763. The soft-paste Cozzi factory fared better, lasting from 1764 to 1812. The Le Nove factory produced from about 1752 to 1773, then was revived from 1781 to 1802.

===== England =====
The first soft-paste in England was demonstrated by Thomas Briand to the Royal Society in 1742 and is believed to have been based on the Saint-Cloud formula. In 1749, Thomas Frye took out a patent on a porcelain containing bone ash. This was the first bone china, subsequently perfected by Josiah Spode. William Cookworthy discovered deposits of kaolin in Cornwall, and his factory at Plymouth, established in 1768, used kaolin and china stone to make hard-paste porcelain with a body composition similar to that of the Chinese porcelains of the early 18th century. But the great success of English ceramics in the 18th century was based on soft-paste porcelain, and refined earthenwares such as creamware, which could compete with porcelain, and had devastated the faience industries of France and other continental countries by the end of the century. Most English porcelain from the late 18th century to the present is bone china.

In the twenty-five years after Briand's demonstration, a number of factories were founded in England to make soft-paste tableware and figures:

- Chelsea (1743)
- Bow (1745)
- St James's (1748)
- Bristol porcelain (1748)
- Longton Hall (1750)
- Royal Crown Derby (1750 or 1757)
- Royal Worcester (1751)
- Lowestoft porcelain (1757)
- Wedgwood (1759)
- Spode (1767)

== Applications other than decorative and tableware ==
=== Electric insulators ===
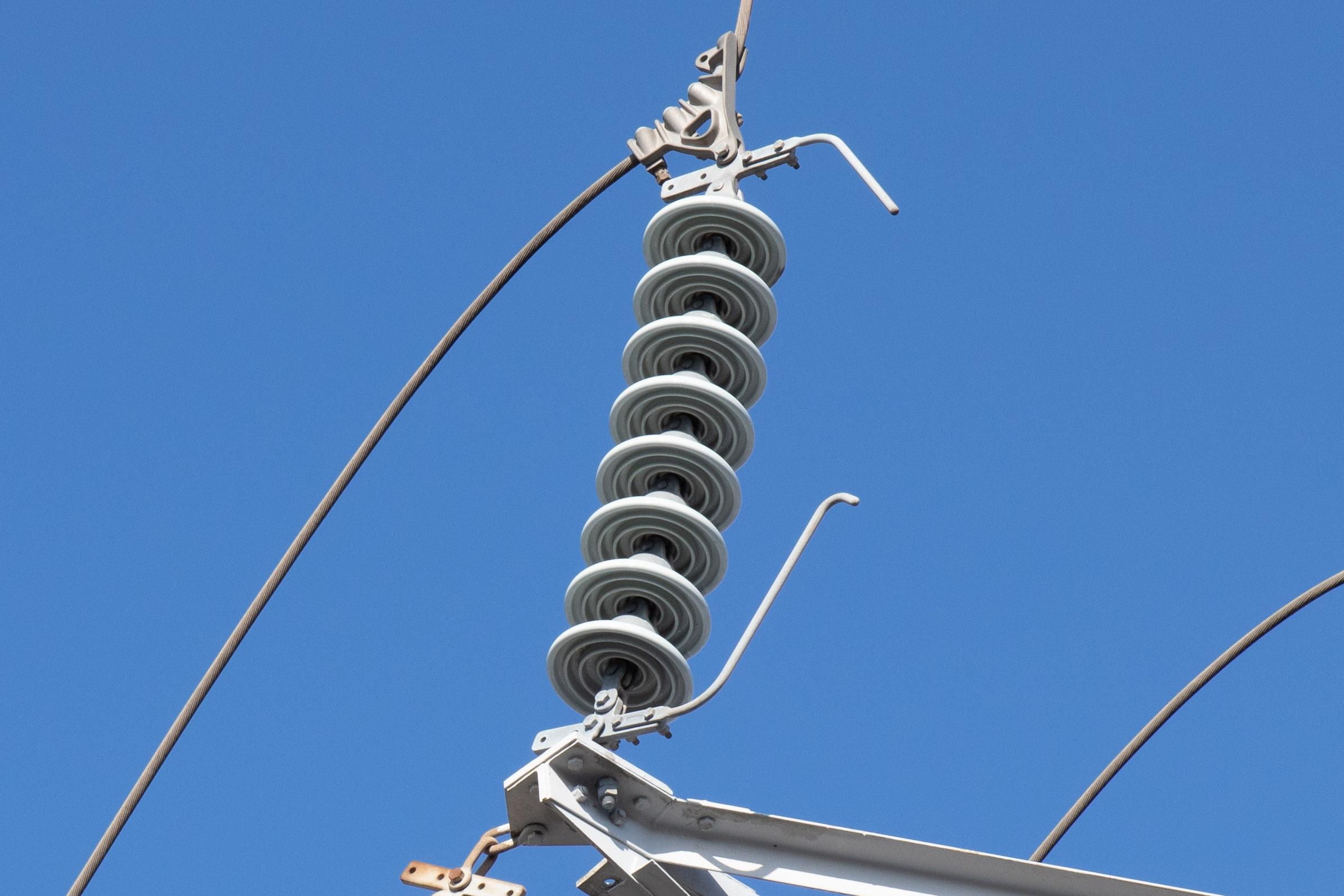
A string of 8 insulators on a 66 kV transmission line

Porcelain has been used for electrical insulators since at least 1878, with another source reporting earlier use of porcelain insulators on the telegraph line between Frankfurt and Berlin. It is widely used for insulators in electrical power transmission system due to its high stability of electrical, mechanical and thermal properties even in harsh environments.

A body for electrical porcelain typically contains varying proportions of ball clay, kaolin, feldspar, quartz, calcined alumina and calcined bauxite. A variety of secondary materials can also be used, such as binders which burn off during firing. UK manufacturers typically fired the porcelain to a maximum of 1200 °C in an oxidising atmosphere, whereas reduction firing is standard practice at Chinese manufacturers.

In 2018, a porcelain bushing insulator manufactured by NGK in Handa, Aichi Prefecture, Japan was certified as the world's largest ceramic structure by Guinness World Records. It is 11.3 m in height and 1.5 m in diameter.

The global market for high-voltage insulators was estimated to be worth US$4.95 billion in 2015, of which porcelain accounts for just over 48%.

=== Chemical porcelain ===
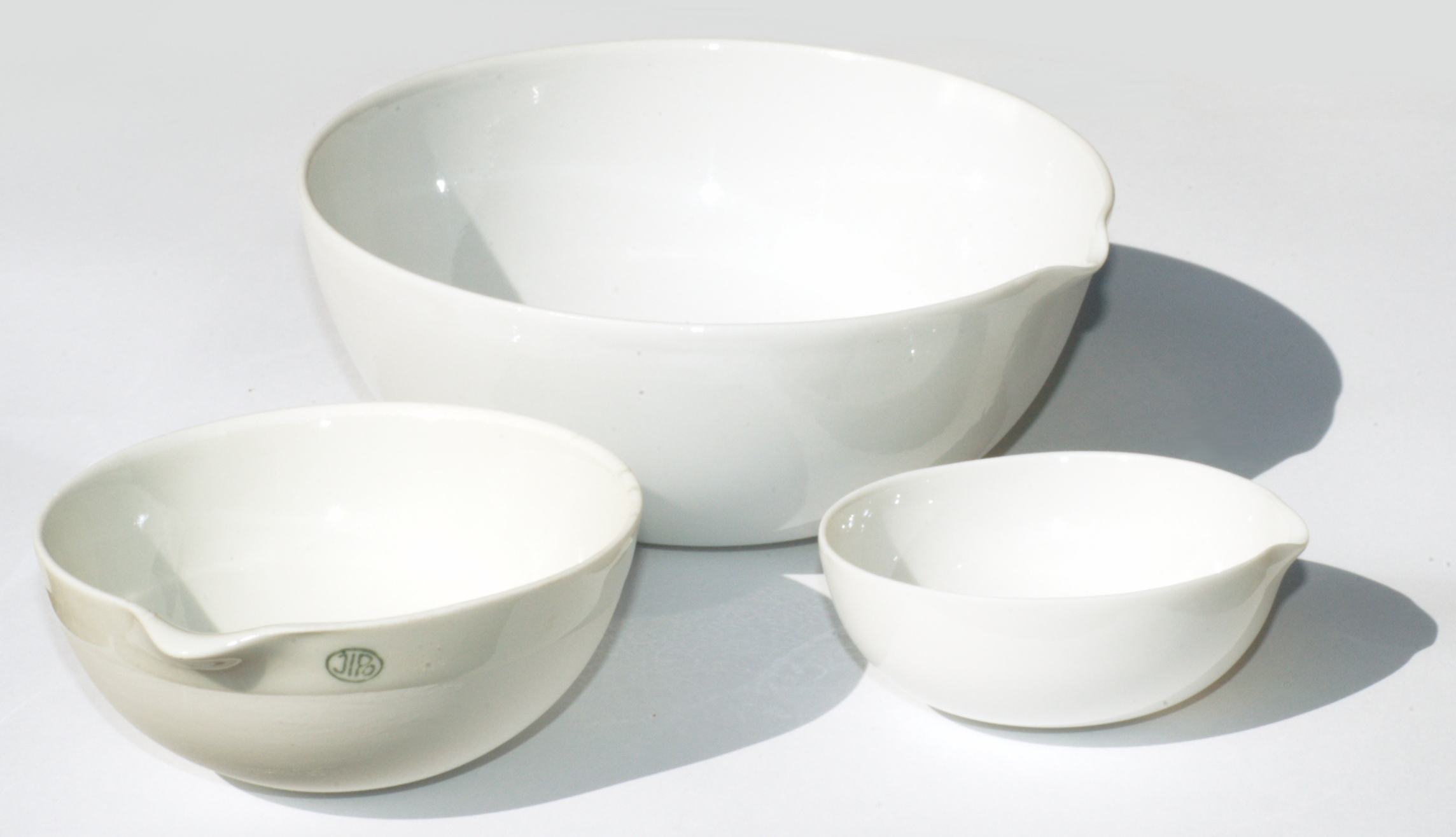
Evaporating dishes made of chemical porcelain

A type of porcelain characterised by low thermal expansion, high mechanical strength and high chemical resistance. Used for laboratory ware, such as reaction vessels, combustion boats, evaporating dishes and Büchner funnels. Raw materials for the body include kaolin, quartz, feldspar, calcined alumina, and possibly also low percentages of other materials. A number of International standards specify the properties of the porcelain, such as ASTM C515.

=== Tiles ===
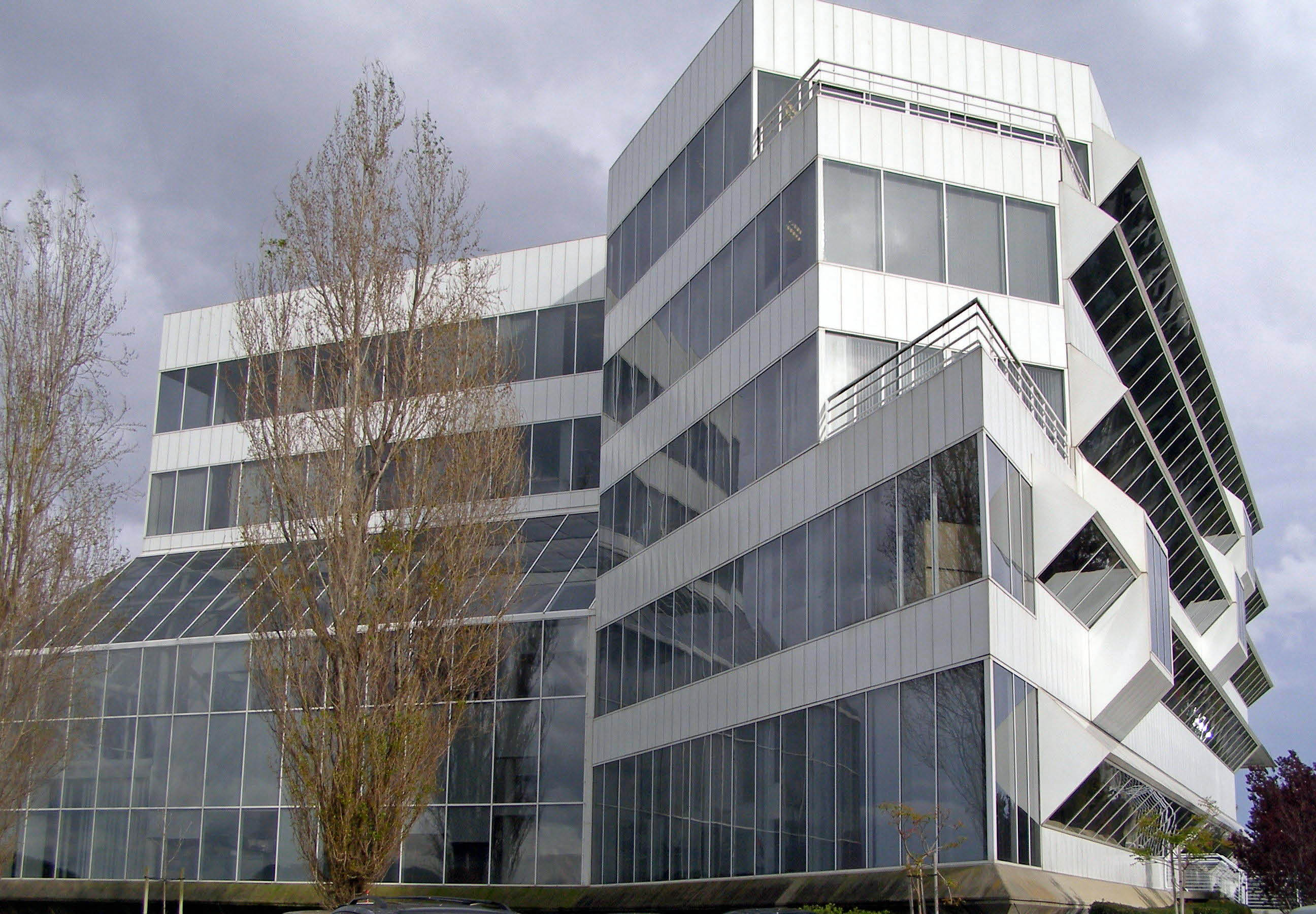
Dakin Building, Brisbane, California, faced with porcelain tiles

A porcelain tile has been defined as "a ceramic mosaic tile or paver that is generally made by the dust-pressed method of a composition resulting in a tile that is dense, fine-grained, and smooth with sharply formed face, usually impervious and having colors of the porcelain type which are usually of a clear, luminous type or granular blend thereof." Manufacturers are found across the world with Italy being the global leader, producing over 380 million square metres in 2006.

Historic examples of rooms decorated entirely in porcelain tiles can be found in several palaces including ones at Galleria Sabauda in Turin, Museo di Doccia in Sesto Fiorentino, Museo di Capodimonte in Naples, the Royal Palace of Madrid and the nearby Royal Palace of Aranjuez. and the Porcelain Tower of Nanjing. More recent examples include the Dakin Building in Brisbane, California and the Gulf Building in Houston, Texas, which when constructed in 1929 had a 21-metre-long (69 ft) porcelain logo on its exterior.

=== Sanitaryware ===
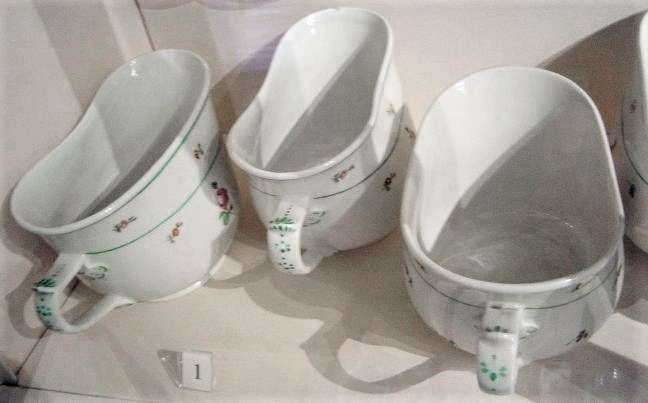
Porcelain chamber pots from Vienna.

Because of its durability, lack of rusting, and impermeability, glazed porcelain has been in use for personal hygiene since at least the third quarter of the 17th century. During this period, porcelain chamber pots were commonly found in higher-class European households, and the term "bourdaloue" was used as the name for the pot.

Whilst modern sanitaryware, such as toilets and washbasins, is made of ceramic materials, porcelain is no longer used and vitreous china is the dominant material. Bath tubs are not made of porcelain, but of enamel on a metal base, usually of cast iron. Porcelain enamel is a marketing term used in the US, and is not porcelain but vitreous enamel.

=== Dental porcelain ===
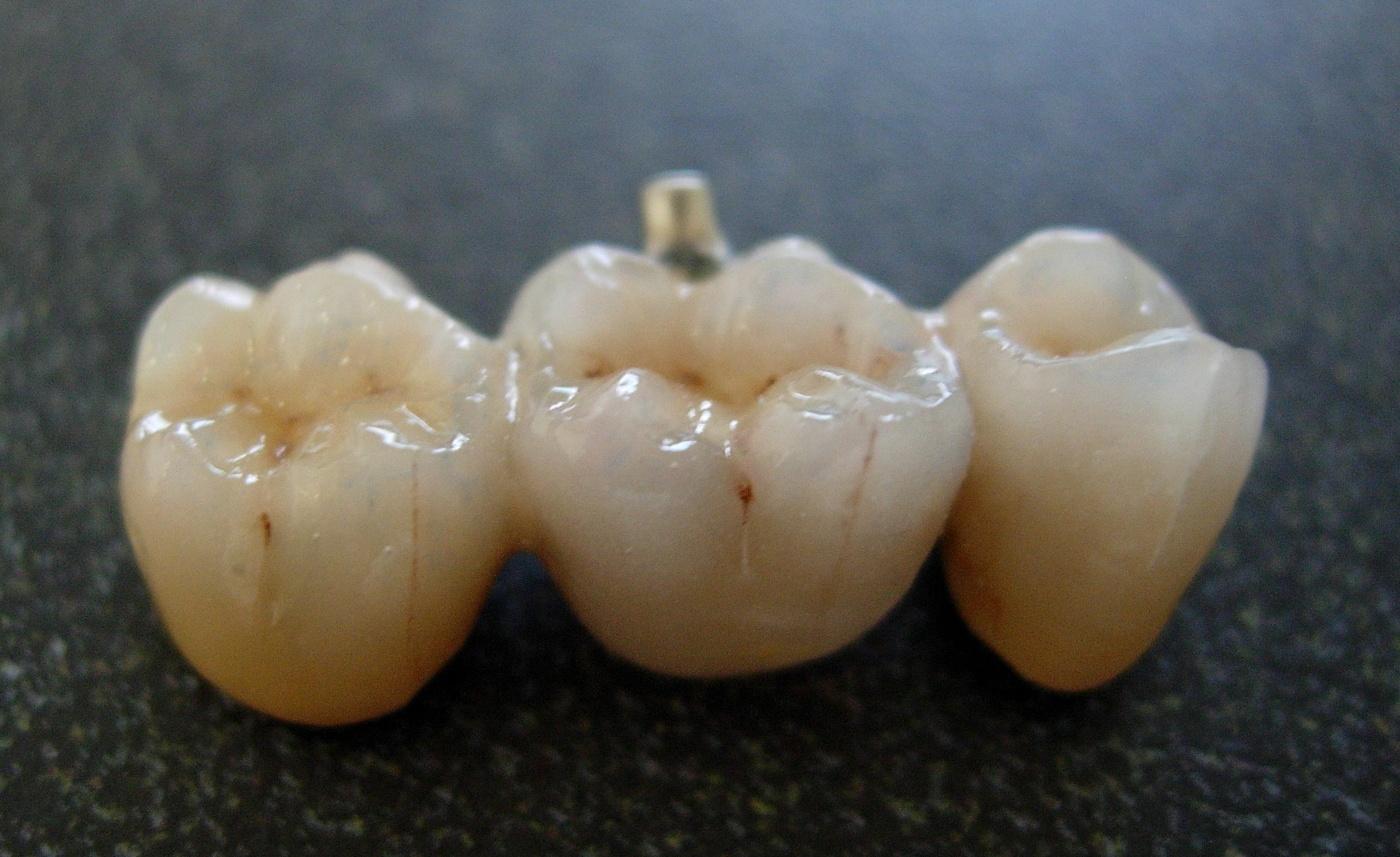
Dental porcelain bridge

Dental porcelain is used for crowns, bridges and veneers. A formulation of dental porcelain is 70-85% feldspar, 12-25% quartz, 3-5% kaolin, up to 15% glass and around 1% colourants.

== Manufacturers ==
- The Americas
  - Brazil
    - Germer Porcelanas Finas
    - Porcelana Schmidt
  - United States
    - Blue Ridge
    - CoorsTek, Inc.
    - Franciscan
    - Lenox
    - Lotus Ware
    - Pickard China
- Asia
  - China
    - Canton porcelain
    - Cizhou ware
    - Dehua ware
    - Ding ware
    - Ge ware
    - Guan ware
    - Jian ware
    - Jingdezhen porcelain
    - Jizhou ware
    - Jun ware
    - Kraak ware
    - Longquan ware
    - Ru ware
    - Swatow ware
    - Xing ware
    - Yaozhou ware
    - Yixing ware
    - Yue ware
  - Iran
    - Maghsoud Group of Factories, (1993–present)
    - Zarin Iran Porcelain Industries, (1881–present)
  - Japan
    - Hirado ware
    - Kakiemon
    - Nabeshima ware
    - Narumi
    - Noritake
  - Malaysia
    - Royal Selangor
  - South Korea
    - Haengnam Chinaware
    - Hankook Chinaware
  - Sri Lanka
    - Dankotuwa Porcelain
    - Noritake Lanka Porcelain
    - Royal Fernwood Porcelain
  - Taiwan
    - Franz Collection
  - Turkey
    - Yildiz Porselen (1890–1936, 1994–present)
    - Kütahya Porselen (1970–present)
    - Güral Porselen (1989–present)
    - Porland Porselen (1976–present)
    - Istanbul Porselen (1963 – early 1990s)
    - Sümerbank Porselen (1957–1994)
  - United Arab Emirates
    - RAK Porcelain
  - Vietnam
    - Minh Long I porcelain (1970–present)
    - Bát Tràng porcelain (1352–present)
- Europe
  - Austria
    - Vienna Porcelain Manufactory, 1718–1864
    - Vienna Porcelain Manufactory Augarten, 1923–present
  - Croatia
    - Inkerpor (1953–present)
  - Czech Republic
    - Haas & Czjzek, Horní Slavkov (1792–2011)
    - Thun 1794, Klášterec nad Ohří (1794–present)
    - Český porcelán a.s., Dubí, Eichwelder Porzellan und Ofenfabriken Bloch & Co. Böhmen (1864–present)
    - Rudolf Kämpf, Nové Sedlo (Sokolov District) (1907–present)
  - Denmark
    - Aluminia
    - Bing & Grøndahl
    - Denmark porcelain
    - P. Ipsens Enke
    - Kastrup Vaerk
    - Kronjyden
    - Porcelænshaven
    - Royal Copenhagen (1775–present)
    - GreenGate
  - Finland
    - Arabia
  - France
    - Saint-Cloud porcelain (1693–1766)
    - Chantilly porcelain (1730–1800)
    - Vincennes porcelain (1740–1756)
    - Mennecy-Villeroy porcelain (1745–1765)
    - Sèvres porcelain (1756–present)
    - Revol porcelain (1789–present)
    - Limoges porcelain
    - Haviland porcelain
  - Germany
    - Current porcelain manufacturers in Germany
  - Hungary
    - Hollóháza Porcelain Manufactory (1777–present)
    - Herend Porcelain Manufacture (1826–present)
    - Zsolnay Porcelain Manufacture (1853–present)
  - Italy
    - Richard-Ginori 1735 Manifattura di Doccia (1735–present)
    - Capodimonte porcelain (1743–1759)
    - Naples porcelain (1771–1806)
    - Manifattura Italiana Porcellane Artistiche Fabris (1922–1972)
    - Mangani SRL, Porcellane d'Arte (Florence)
  - Lithuania
    - Jiesia
  - Netherlands (Note: Notwithstanding its company name, "De Koninklijke Porceleyne Fles N.V." of Delft, The Netherlands, is a manufacturer of Delftware, a variety of faience, not of porcelain.)
    - Haagsche Plateelbakkerij Rozenburg (1883–1916)
    - Loosdrechts Porselein
    - Weesp Porselein
  - Norway
    - Egersund porcelain
    - Figgjo (1941–present)
    - Herrebøe porcelain
    - Porsgrund
    - Stavangerflint
  - Poland
    - AS Ćmielów
    - Fabryka Fajansu i Porcelany
    - Polskie Fabryki Porcelany "Ćmielów" i "Chodzież" S.A.
    - Kristoff Porcelana
    - Lubiana S.A.
  - Portugal
    - Vista Alegre
    - Sociedade Porcelanas de Alcobaça
    - Costa Verde (company), located in the district of Aveiro
  - Russia
    - Imperial Porcelain Factory, Saint Petersburg (1744–present)
    - Verbilki Porcelain (1766–present), Verbilki near Taldom
    - Gzhel ceramics (1802–present), Gzhel
    - Dulevo Farfor (1832–present), Likino-Dulyovo
  - Spain
    - Buen Retiro Royal Porcelain Factory (1760–1812)
    - Real Fábrica de Sargadelos (1808–present, intermittently)
    - Porvasal
  - Sweden
    - Rörstrand
    - Gustavsberg porcelain
  - Switzerland
    - Suisse Langenthal
  - United Kingdom
    - Aynsley China (1775–present)
    - Belleek (1884–present)
    - Bow porcelain factory (1747–1776)
    - Caughley porcelain
    - Chelsea porcelain factory (c. 1745; merged with Derby in 1770)
    - Coalport porcelain
    - Davenport
    - Goss crested china
    - Liverpool porcelain
    - Longton Hall porcelain
    - Lowestoft Porcelain Factory
    - Mintons Ltd (1793–1968; merged with Royal Doulton)
    - Nantgarw Pottery
    - New Hall porcelain
    - Plymouth Porcelain
    - Rockingham Pottery
    - Royal Crown Derby (1750/57–present)
    - Royal Doulton (1815–2009; acquired by Fiskars)
    - Royal Worcester (1751–2008; acquired by Portmeirion Pottery)
    - Spode (1767–2008; acquired by Portmeirion Pottery)
    - Saint James's Factory (or "Girl-in-a-Swing", 1750s)
    - Swansea porcelain
    - Vauxhall porcelain
    - Wedgwood, (factory 1759–present, porcelain 1812–1829, and modern. Acquired by Fiskars)

== See also ==
- Blue and white porcelain
- List of porcelain manufacturers

== Sources ==
- Battie, David, ed., Sotheby's Concise Encyclopedia of Porcelain, 1990, Conran Octopus. ISBN 1850292515
- Le Corbellier, Clare, Eighteenth-century Italian porcelain, 1985, Metropolitan Museum of Art, (fully available online as PDF)
- Smith, Lawrence, Harris, Victor and Clark, Timothy, Japanese Art: Masterpieces in the British Museum, 1990, British Museum Publications, ISBN 0714114464
- Vainker, S.J., Chinese Pottery and Porcelain, 1991, British Museum Press, 9780714114705
- Watson, William ed., The Great Japan Exhibition: Art of the Edo Period 1600–1868, 1981, Royal Academy of Arts/Weidenfeld & Nicolson
