= List of porcelain manufacturers =

== China ==
- Ding ware
- Jingdezhen porcelain

== Japan ==
- Hirado ware
- Kakiemon
- Mikasa & Company
- Nabeshima ware
- Narumi
- Noritake

== Europe ==
- Porcelain manufacturing companies in Europe

=== Austria ===
- Vienna Porcelain Manufactory, 1718–1864
- Vienna Porcelain Manufactory Augarten, 1923–present

=== Croatia ===
- Inkerpor, (1953–present)

=== Czech Republic ===
- Haas & Czjzek, Horní Slavkov, (1792–2011)
- Thun 1794, Klášterec nad Ohří, (1794–present)
- Český porcelán a.s., Dubí, Eichwelder Porzellan und Ofenfabriken Bloch & Co. Böhmen, (1864–present)
- Rudolf Kämpf, Nové Sedlo (Sokolov District), (1907–present)

=== Denmark ===
- Aluminia
- Bing & Grøndahl
- Denmark porcelain
- P. Ipsens Enke
- Kastrup Vaerk
- Kronjyden
- Porcelænshaven
- Royal Copenhagen (1775–present)
- GreenGate

=== Finland ===
- Arabia
- Kupittaan Savi
- Savitorppa
- Kultakeramiikka
- Kermansavi
- Pentik (see Anu Pentik)

=== France ===
- Saint-Cloud porcelain, (1693–1766)
- Chantilly porcelain, (1730–1800)
- Vincennes porcelain, (1740–1756)
- Mennecy-Villeroy porcelain, (1745–1765)
- Sèvres porcelain, (1756–present)
- Revol porcelain, (1789–present)
- Limoges porcelain
- Haviland porcelain

=== Germany ===
- Current porcelain manufacturers in Germany

=== Hungary ===
- Hollóháza Porcelain Manufactory, (1777–present)
- Herend Porcelain Manufacture, (1826–present)
- Zsolnay Porcelain Manufacture, (1853–present)
- Alföld Porcelán Edénygyár, (1969–present)

=== India ===
- Arta Broch Ceramics
- TCL Ceramics (Formerly Tata Ceramics Limited)

=== Ireland ===
- Irish Dresden

=== Italy ===
- Richard-Ginori 1735 Manifattura di Doccia, (1735–present)
- Porcellane Principe snc, Porcellane di capodimonte (Vicenza)
- Iconoclastic©, Porcellane di design]] (Vicenza)
- Capodimonte porcelain, (1743–1759)
- Naples porcelain, 1771–1806
- Manifattura Italiana Porcellane Artistiche Fabris, (1922–1972)
- Mangani SRL, Porcellane d'Arte (Florence)

=== Lithuania ===
- Jiesia

=== Netherlands ===
- Haagsche Plateelbakkerij, Rozenburg
- Loosdrechts Porselein
- Weesp Porselein

=== Norway ===
- Egersund porcelain
- Figgjo (1941–present)
- Herrebøe porcelain
- Porsgrund
- Stavangerflint

=== Poland ===
- Polskie Fabryki Porcelany “Ćmielów” i "Chodzież" S.A.
- Kristoff Porcelana
- Lubiana S.A.

=== Portugal ===
- Vista Alegre (1824–present)
- Sociedade Porcelanas de Alcobaça
- Costa Verde (company), located in the district of Aveiro

=== Russia ===
- Imperial Porcelain Factory, Saint Petersburg (1744–present)
- Verbilki Porcelain (1766–present), Verbilki near Taldom
- Gzhel ceramics (1802–present), Gzhel
- Dulevo Farfor (1832–present), Likino-Dulyovo
- Lomonosov

=== Spain ===
- Buen Retiro Royal Porcelain Factory (1760–1812)
- Real Fábrica de Sargadelos (1808–Present, intermittently)
- Porvasal

=== Switzerland ===
- Suisse Langenthal

=== Sweden ===
- Rörstrand
- Gustavsberg porcelain

=== United Kingdom ===
- Aynsley China, (1775–present)
- Belleek, (1884–present)
- Bow porcelain factory, (1747–1776)
- Caughley porcelain
- Chelsea porcelain factory, (c. 1745, merged with Derby in 1770)
- Churchill China
- Coalport porcelain
- Davenport
- Denby Pottery Company
- Goss crested china
- Liverpool porcelain
- Longton Hall porcelain
- Lowestoft Porcelain Factory
- Mintons Ltd, (1793–1968, merged with Royal Doulton)
- Nantgarw Pottery
- New Hall porcelain
- Plymouth Porcelain
- Rockingham Pottery
- Royal Crown Derby, (1750/57–present)
- Royal Doulton, (1815–2009 acquired by Fiskars)
- Royal Worcester, (1751–2008 acquired by Portmeirion Pottery)
- Spode, (1767–2008 acquired by Portmeirion Pottery)
- Saint James's Factory (or "Girl-in-a-Swing", 1750s)
- Swansea porcelain
- Vauxhall porcelain
- Wedgwood, (factory 1759–present, porcelain 1812–1829, and modern. Acquired by Fiskars)

== Brazil ==
- Germer Porcelanas Finas
- Porcelana Schmidt

== Colombia ==
- https://es.wikipedia.org/wiki/Corona_(Colombia)

== Iran ==
- Maghsoud Factories Group, (1993–present)
  - Zarin Iran porcelain Industries, (1881–present)

== Taiwan ==
- Franz Collection

== Malaysia ==
- Royal Selangor

== South Africa ==
- Continental China

== South Korea ==
- Haengnam Chinaware
  - Hankook Chinaware
- Prouna

== Sri Lanka ==
- Dankotuwa Porcelain
- Noritake Lanka Porcelain
- Royal Fernwood Porcelain

== Turkey ==
- Yildiz Porselen (1890– 1936 / 1994–present)
- Bonna Porselen (1983-present)
- Kütahya Porselen (1970–present)
- Güral Porselen (1989–present)
- Porland Porselen (1976–present)
- Istanbul Porselen (1963– early 1990s)
- Sümerbank Porselen (1957–1994)

== United Arab Emirates ==
- RAK Porcelain

== United States ==
- Wonder Porcelain
- Blue Ridge
- Franciscan
- Lenox
- Lotus Ware
- Pickard China

== Vietnam ==
- Minh Long I porcelain, (1970–present)
