= Prouna =

South Korean company

Prouna (Korean: 프라우나) is a South Korean company that produces luxury ceramics for the consumer market.

Ceramics made by Prouna are used by the British royal family, the Qatari royal family, the United Arab Emirates royal family.
