= Jingdezhen porcelain =

Chinese pottery produced in Jingdezhen

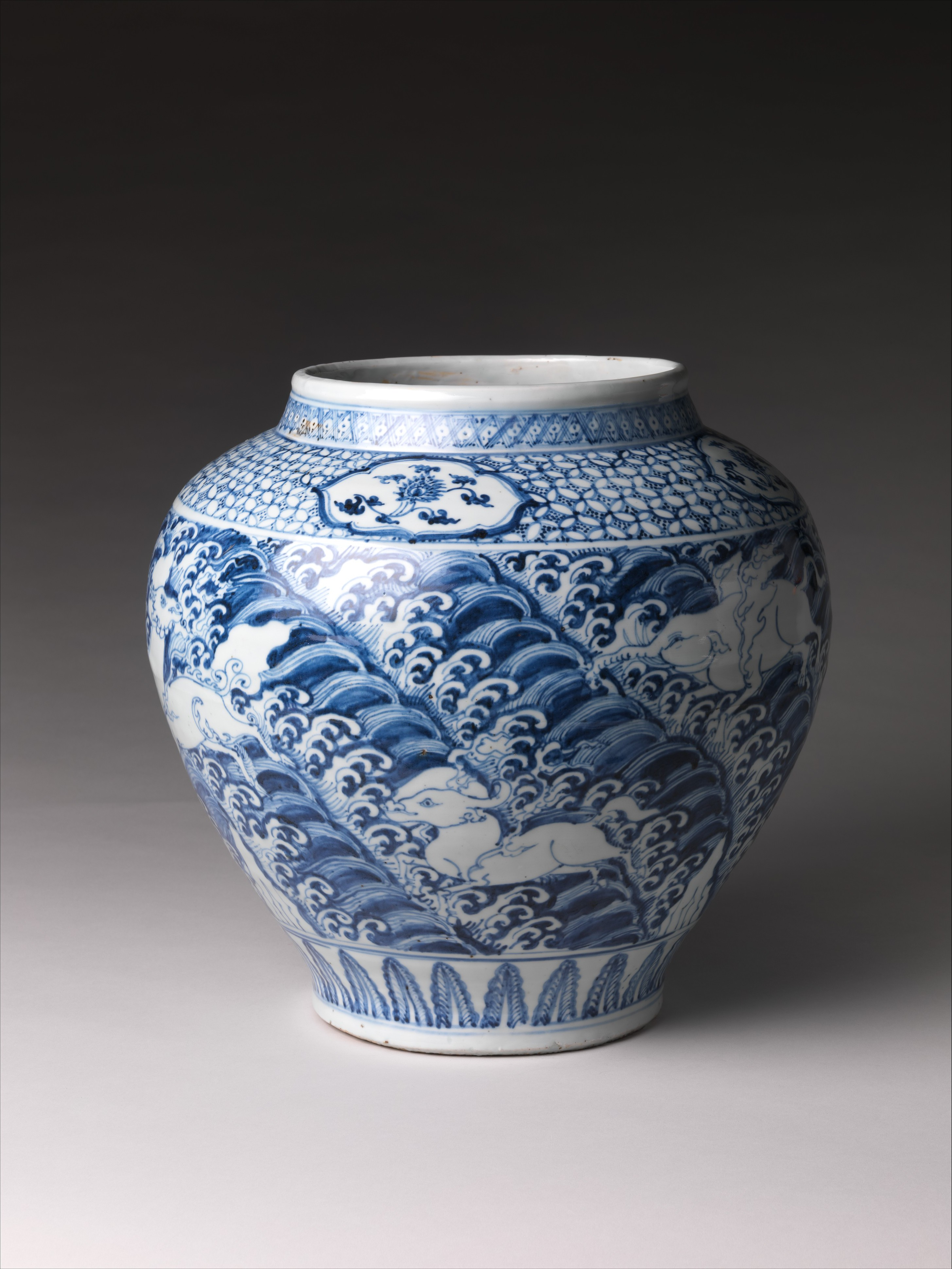
- Jingdezhen ware blue and white jar with cobalt decoration under transparent glaze, Ming dynasty (mid-15th century). Metropolitan Museum of Art.
- Branch: Chinese ceramics
- Years active: Eastern Han – present (2nd century – present); peak during Ming and Qing dynasties
- Location: Jingdezhen, Jiangxi, China
- Influences: Yue ware, Ding ware, Qingbai ware
- Influenced: European porcelain (Meissen, Sèvres), Arita ware, Korean porcelain, Vietnamese ceramics

Jingdezhen porcelain (simplified Chinese: 景德镇陶瓷; traditional Chinese: 景德鎮陶瓷) is Chinese porcelain produced in or near Jingdezhen in Jiangxi province in southern China. Jingdezhen may have produced pottery as early as the sixth century CE, though it is named after the reign name of Emperor Zhenzong, in whose reign it became a major kiln site, around 1004. By the 14th century it had become the largest centre of production of Chinese porcelain, which it has remained, increasing its dominance in subsequent centuries. From the Ming period onwards, official kilns in Jingdezhen were controlled by the emperor, making imperial porcelain in large quantity for the court and the emperor to give as gifts.

Porcelain production in Jingdezhen was divided into two distinct systems: Imperial Kiln Factory (Chinese: 御窰廠) and the private kilns (Chinese: 民窰). The Imperial Kiln Factory was officially established in 1369 during the Hongwu reign of the Ming dynasty, located at Zhushan (Pearl Hill) in the city center. It was directly administered by the court and produced porcelain exclusively for the imperial household. These wares were subject to strict quality control; defective pieces were destroyed on-site to prevent them from entering the market. The factory operated regardless of cost, prioritizing artistic excellence over commercial considerations.

Although apparently an unpromising location for potteries, being a remote town in a hilly region, Jingdezhen is close to the best quality deposits of petuntse, more contemporarily called pottery stone in China, as well as being surrounded by forests, mostly of pine, providing wood for the kilns. It also has a river leading to river systems flowing north and south, facilitating transport of fragile wares. The imperial kilns were in the centre of the city at Zhushan (Pearl Hill), with many other kilns four kilometres away at Hutian.

It has produced a great variety of pottery and porcelain, for the Chinese market and as Chinese export porcelain, but its best-known high quality porcelain wares have been successively Qingbai ware in the Song and Yuan dynasties, blue and white porcelain from the 1330s, and the "famille rose" and other "famille" colours under the Qing dynasty.

== Official kilns ==
The Mongol Yuan dynasty established a body, the "Fuliang Porcelain Bureau" to regulate production, and the next Ming dynasty established official kilns to produce porcelain for the emperor; Jingdezhen continued to produce Imperial porcelain until the end of Imperial rule. The imperial kilns were situated at Pearl Hill (Zhushan) in Jingdezhen; some scholars give a date of 1369 for the commencement of production. But there continued to be many other kilns, producing wares for many distinct markets.

The imperial court, except during periods of crisis, generated a huge demand for porcelain. Apart from the vast main palaces and other residences, for much of the period the many princes had subsidiary regional courts. There were imperial temples to be supplied, each of which was given monochrome wares in different colours, as well as several monasteries and shrines. The porcelain to which different ranks of the imperial household were entitled were set out in minute detail in regulations. The final version of these, from 1899, specified that the Empress Dowager Cixi was allowed 821 pieces of yellow porcelain, while the Empress had 1,014. A concubine of the first rank had 121 pieces of yellow with a white interior, but those of the second rank had yellow decorated with green dragons.

=== Ming ===
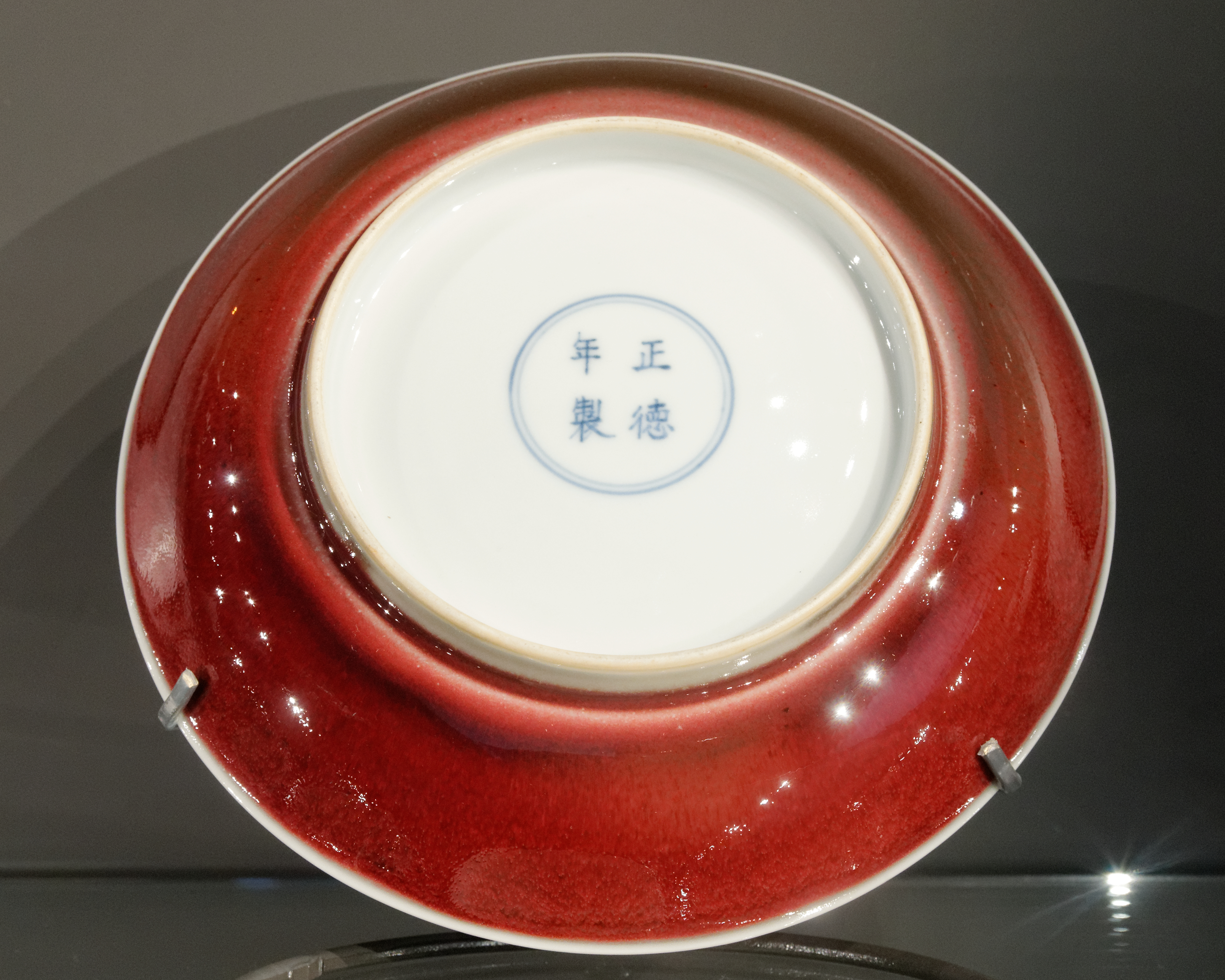
Copper-red saucer-dish with the reign mark of Zhengde (1506–1521)

The Ming dynasty is normally dated as beginning in 1368, but there was a long revolt against the Yuan dynasty, and Jingdezhen was lost by them in 1352. By 1402 there were twelve imperial kilns at Jingdezhen, then one of three areas with imperial kilns. Production was controlled by a ministry in the capital, by then in Beijing, far to the north. Production was on a huge scale, employing hundreds if not thousands of workers, whose tasks were divided into several specialities to increase efficiency and consistency. In 1433 a single order from the palace was for 443,500 pieces of porcelain, all with dragon and phoenix designs. Court artists were by now supplying drawn or woodblock printed designs from the capital. These enormous quantities were distributed by the palace to the subsidiary courts of the many Ming princes sent to govern provinces, as well as being presented as gifts to other notables, and sent abroad as diplomatic gifts. Some may also have been sold, especially for export. Sometimes antique pieces in the Imperial collection were sent to Jingdezhen to be copied.

A recently excavated Ming princely burial has yielded the first example to survive until modern times of a type of gaiwan set known from 15th-century paintings. There is a blue and white Jingdezhen stem cup, that has a silver stand and a gold cover (this dated 1437), all decorated with dragons. Presumably many such sets existed, but recycling the precious metal elements was too tempting at some point, leaving only the porcelain cups. Other imperial porcelains may have carried gilding, which has now worn away.

Under the Yongle Emperor (r. 1402–1424), reign marks were introduced for the first time, applied to porcelain and other types of luxury products made for the imperial court. The supremacy of Jingdezhen was reinforced in the mid-15th century when the imperial kilns producing Longquan celadon, for centuries one of China's finest wares, were closed after celadons fell from fashion. Apart from the much smaller production of monochrome stoneware "official Jun" wares from Henan, used in the palace for flowerpots and the like, Jingdezhen was now the only area making imperial ceramics.

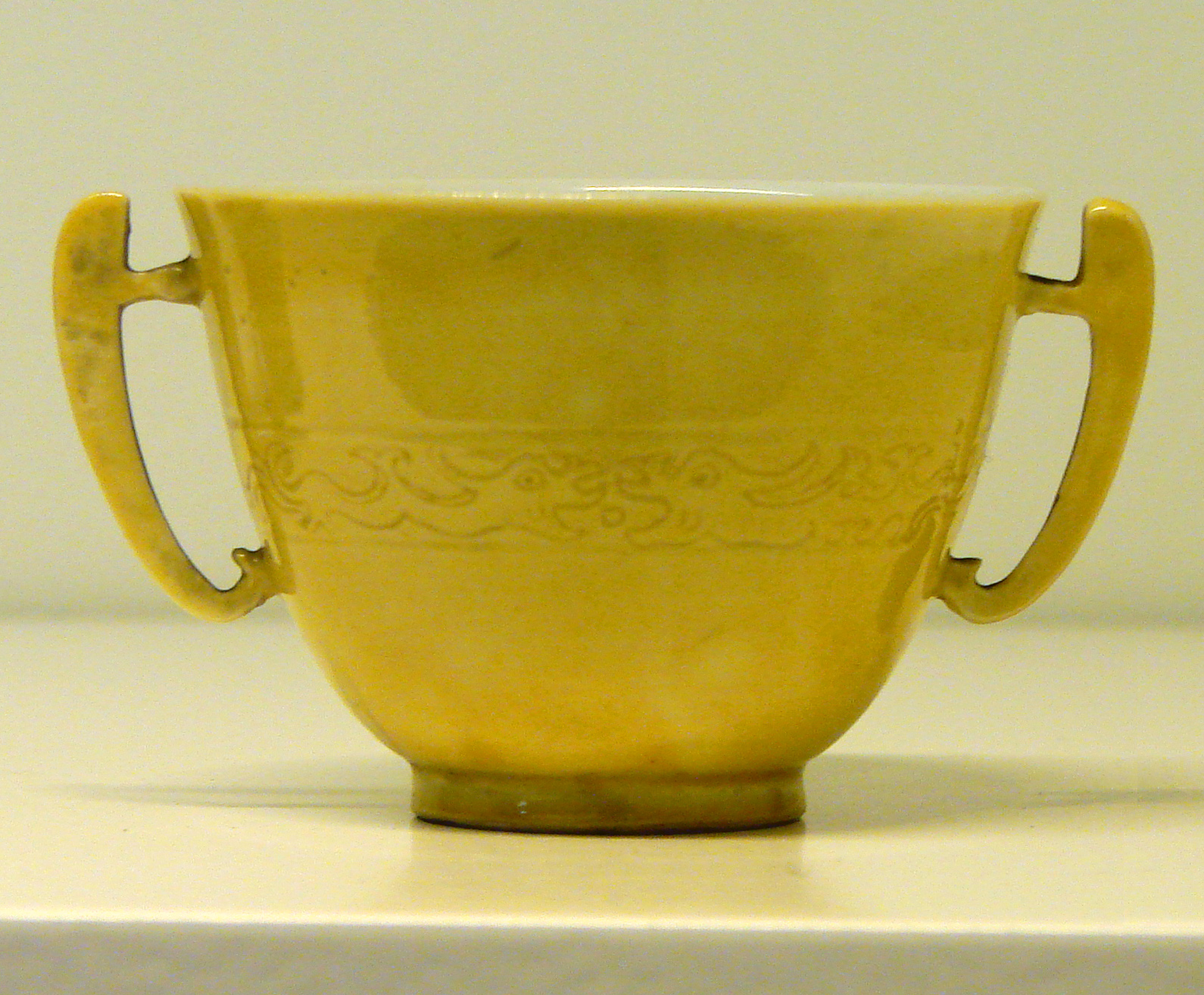
Cup in the imperial yellow, Kangxi emperor (1662–1722)

A wide variety of wares were produced for the court, with blue and white (initially ignored by the court but acceptable by 1402) accompanied by red and white wares using a copper-based underglaze red. This was sometimes combined with the cobalt blue in blue and red pieces. Under the Xuande Emperor (r. 1426–1435) a copper-red monochrome glaze was used for ceremonial wares, of which very few survive. These ceased to be produced after his death, and have never been perfectly imitated, despite later attempts. This suggests the close personal interest some emperors took in the imperial potteries, and also that some secrets must have been restricted to a small group of potters. The Ru ware of the Song dynasty had a similar pattern. In this reign enamel or overglaze decoration was developed, which was to dominate the finer wares in future centuries.

In the late Ming period, the reigns of the five emperors from 1488 to 1620, there was little innovation in styles of decoration, though some alterations in the colours used. In this period the enormous quantities of porcelain made in China seem to have led to low prices and a loss of prestige, at court and in Chinese society in general. Those who could afford to do so still ate from gold, silver or jade; it was in the Islamic world, where the Quran forbad tableware in precious metal, that rulers ate from Chinese porcelain. One disgraced official, whose goods were seized in 1562, had his valuable items confiscated, but not his collection of 45,000 pieces of porcelain, which were sold with his other effects. By the reign of the Wanli Emperor (r. 1573–1620) there was a serious decline in quality.

However the same period saw the spread of porcelain collecting among the scholar-gentry, who were mostly interested in older pieces, though generally not going further back than the Song. This is not the first period of antiquarianism and archaism in Chinese taste, but it has proved long-lasting, and had a considerable effect on subsequent production, producing waves of revivalism, imitation and much downright fakery—the three often being hard to distinguish.

=== Transitional wares ===
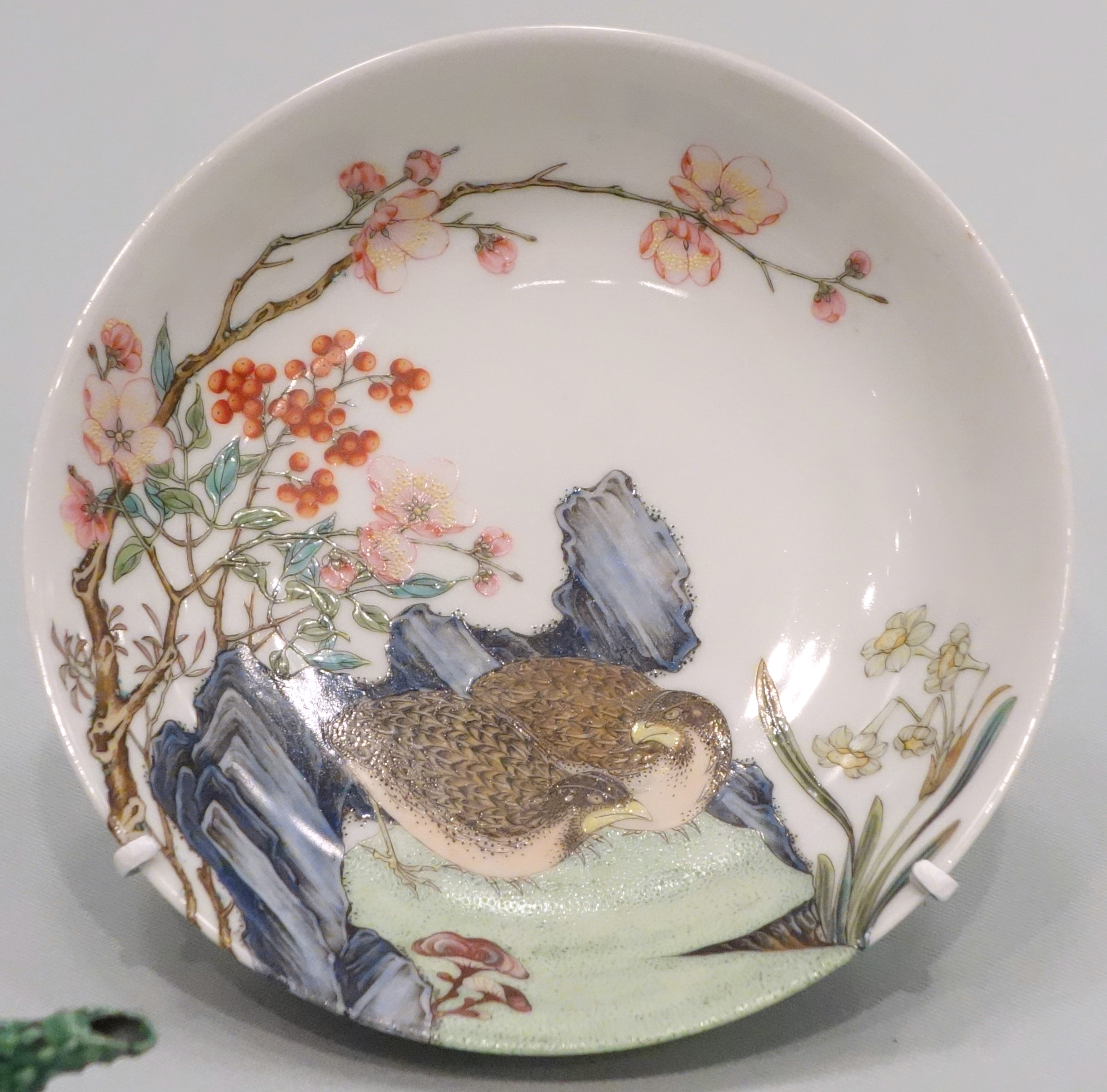
Saucer with motifs celebrating prosperity, Qing dynasty, Yongzheng emperor (r. 1723–1735)

As the Ming dynasty declined, with serious military and financial crises, the imperial court ceased to support the official Jingdezhen kilns, which were largely left to find their own funds from other markets. This situation lasted from 1620 to 1683, when the new Qing dynasty, after some decades struggling with Ming forces, finally resumed large-scale use of Jingdezhen for official wares under the Kangxi emperor (r. 1662–1722). The larger kilns and a major part of the town were destroyed in 1674 by Ming forces after the Revolt of the Three Feudatories had become a civil war. From 1680 to 1688 the reconstruction of the industry was under the control of Zang Yingxuan from the Qing Board of Works. Organised production of court porcelain had resumed by 1683, and the institution of forced labour replaced by waged employment. Succeeding controllers were appointed by the provincial administration up until 1726, when Beijing appointed Nian Xiyao.

Wares of this interim period are often called "Transitional", and include the Tianqi porcelain mostly made for the Japanese market. The effect on the Jingdezhen potters was "liberating", as the range of subject matter in decoration greatly expanded. Printed books had become much more widely available, and were used, directly or indirectly, as sources for scenes on porcelain. Conveniently for the historian, many pieces began to be dated. Towards the end of the period the first famille rose porcelains appeared; the various colour "families" were to dominate production for the luxury market under the Qing.

=== Qing ===
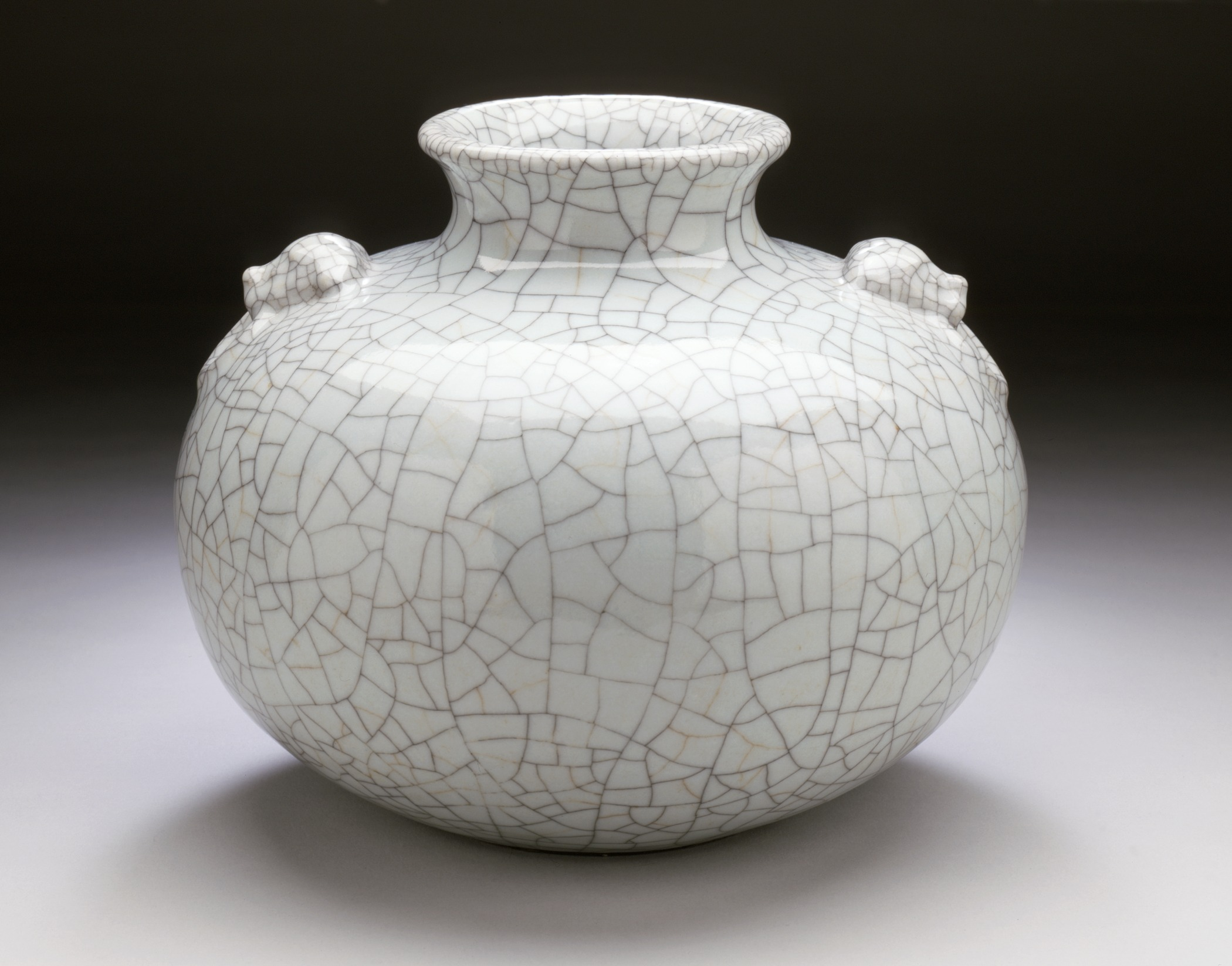
Jar (ping) with beast and ring handles, in crackle glaze imitating Ge ware, Qianlong Emperor

The imperial kilns were revived with 6 kilns and 23 workshops, dividing the other parts of the production process between them. Massive orders for the imperial palaces and temples resumed. While imperial taste in decoration remained somewhat conservative, the technical quality of Kangxi imperial wares reached new heights. The imperial kilns led the development of the new palettes of overglaze enamels; famille verte, developed in two phases, was followed by famille rose, and later others. There was also development of subtle, varied and mottled glazes for monochrome pieces. Sang de boeuf glaze was a copper oxide red, as was peachbloom glaze, which was probably blown onto the piece as powder. These were the last major technical innovations at Jingdezhen, along with a technique for firing gold onto porcelain, rather than mercury gilding completed pieces.

The long reign of the Qianlong emperor (1736–1795) saw continuation of the technical perfection, but aesthetic stagnation. The emperor was a keen art collector and probably personally directed the trends in this period for imitating shapes from ancient metalware, especially ritual bronzes, in porcelain, as well as imitations of wood and other materials. The copying of famous wares from the distant past continued, alongside new styles. In the next two reigns the quality also declined, and orders from the palace were reduced, until the official kilns were destroyed in the Taiping Rebellion in the 1850s. Tongzhi porcelain from 1862 to 1874 dates from after the reconstruction of the Jingdezhen official kilns.

== Major types ==
=== Jingdezhen bluish-white ware ===
Jingdezhen ware became particularly important from the Song period with the production of Qingbai (青白, "Blueish-white") ware. The Jingdezhen Qingbai was a transparent and jade-like type of porcelain, with a transparent glaze giving a blueish-white tint. Decoration was made by delicate carving or incising. Northern Ding ware was the most famous northern Chinese white ware under the Northern Song, but by the end of the Song period Qingbai had eclipsed Ding ware, achieving a predominance for Jingdezhen which it has maintained in subsequent centuries. A key event in this process was the flight of the remaining Northern Song court to the south, after they lost control of the north in the disastrous Jin-Song wars of the 1120s. A new Southern Song court was based in Hangzhou. This may have been accompanied by the movement of potters to Jingdezhen, which increased its output, despite being some two hundred miles from the new capital.

A Qingbai porcelain bottle from Jingdezhen is the earliest piece of Chinese porcelain documented to have reached Europe; this is the Fonthill Vase, which was brought to Europe in the middle of the 14th century.

Under the Yuan dynasty, Jingdezhen's finest whitewares changed to Shufu ware, named after the two character inscription on some pieces. Shufu may mean the pieces were ordered for the Shumiyuan ("Privy Council"); despite this, most examples have appeared outside China. The Shufu pieces are thick, with an opaque white glaze, with a faint blue-green tint. The stem cup shape first appears in these; it lasted until the end of the Ming.

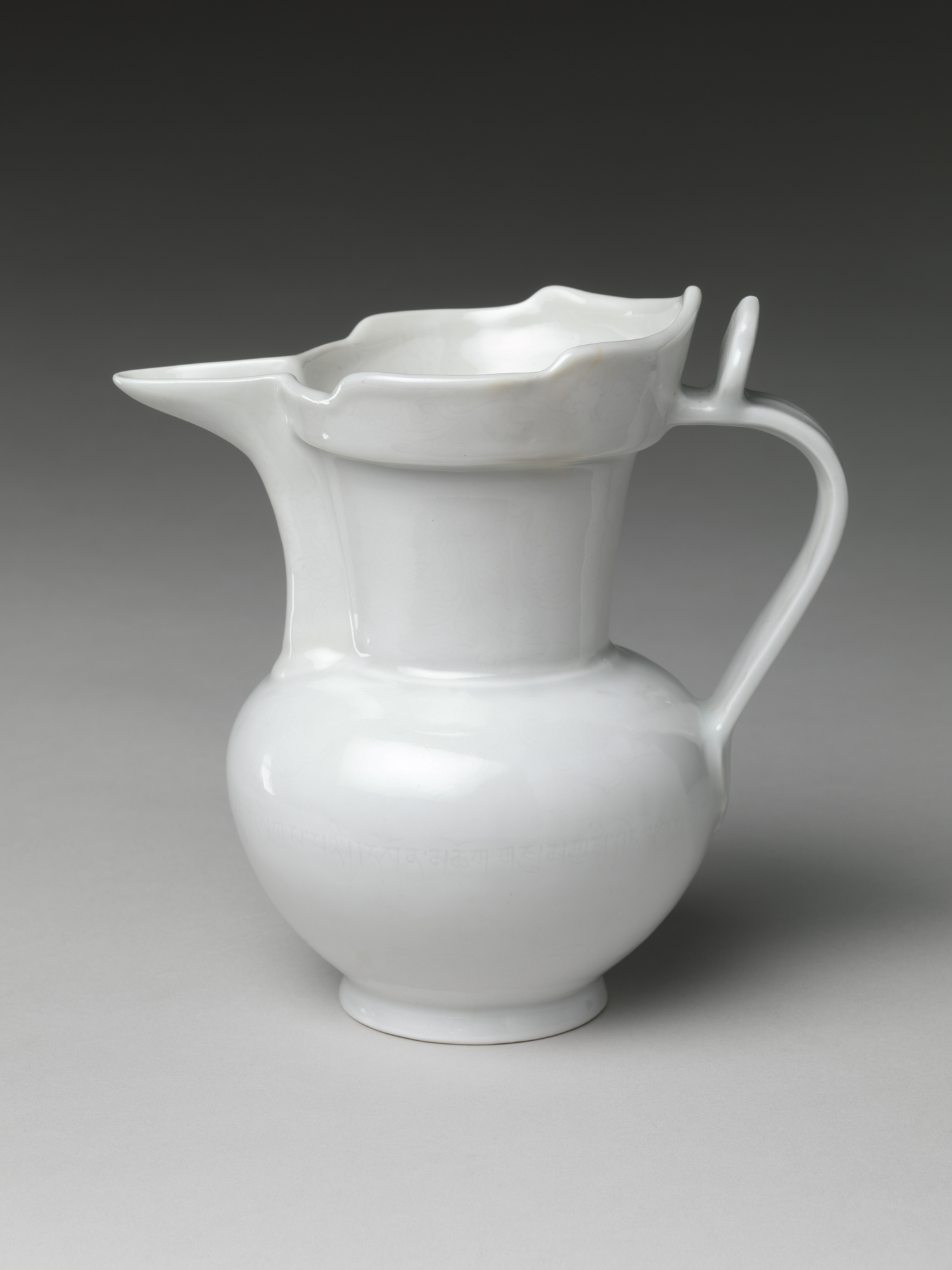
Ewer with anhua (hidden) decoration, Qingbai ware, Ming dynasty, Yongle period (early 15th century). Metropolitan Museum of Art.

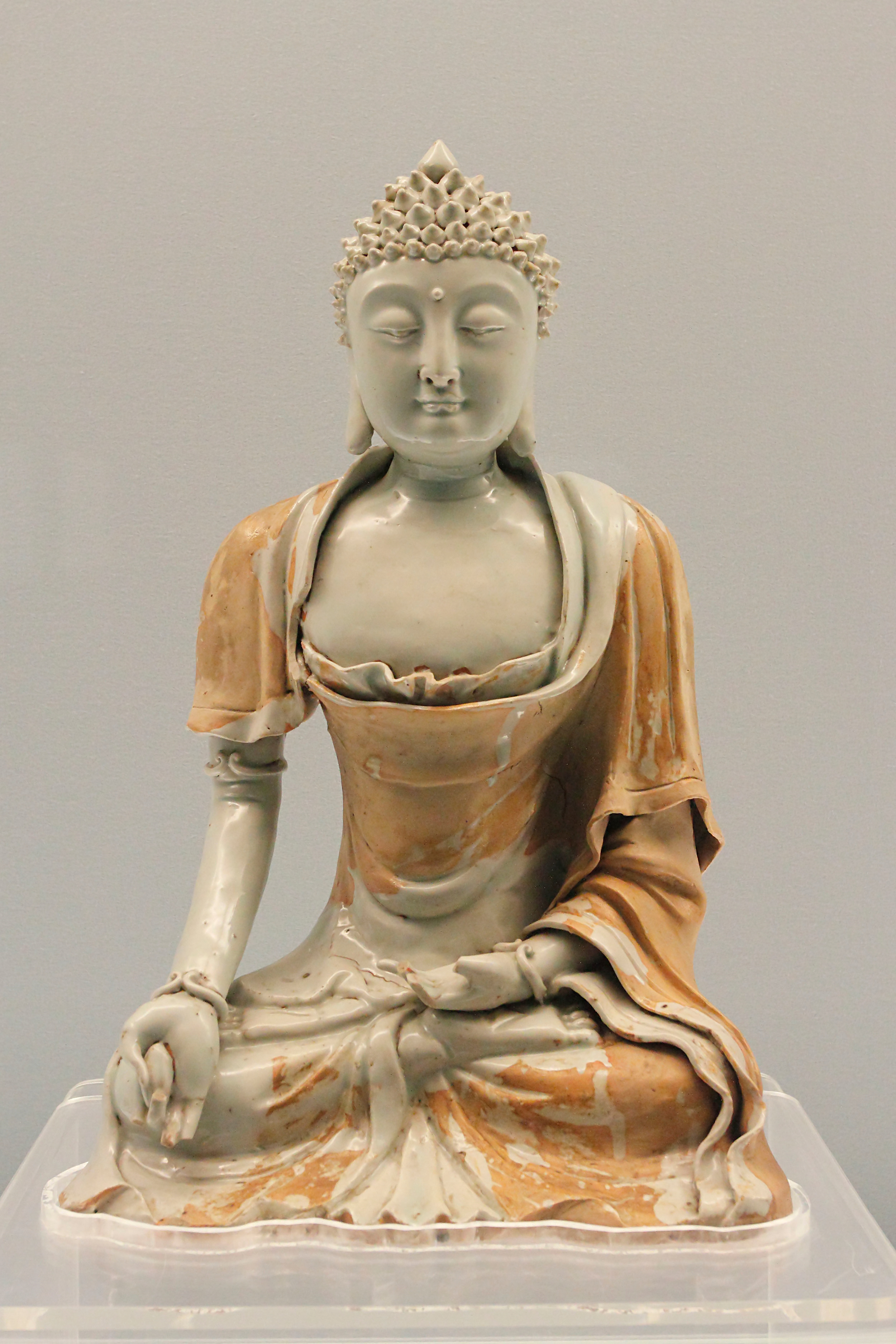
Buddha statue, Qingbai ware, 1271–1368

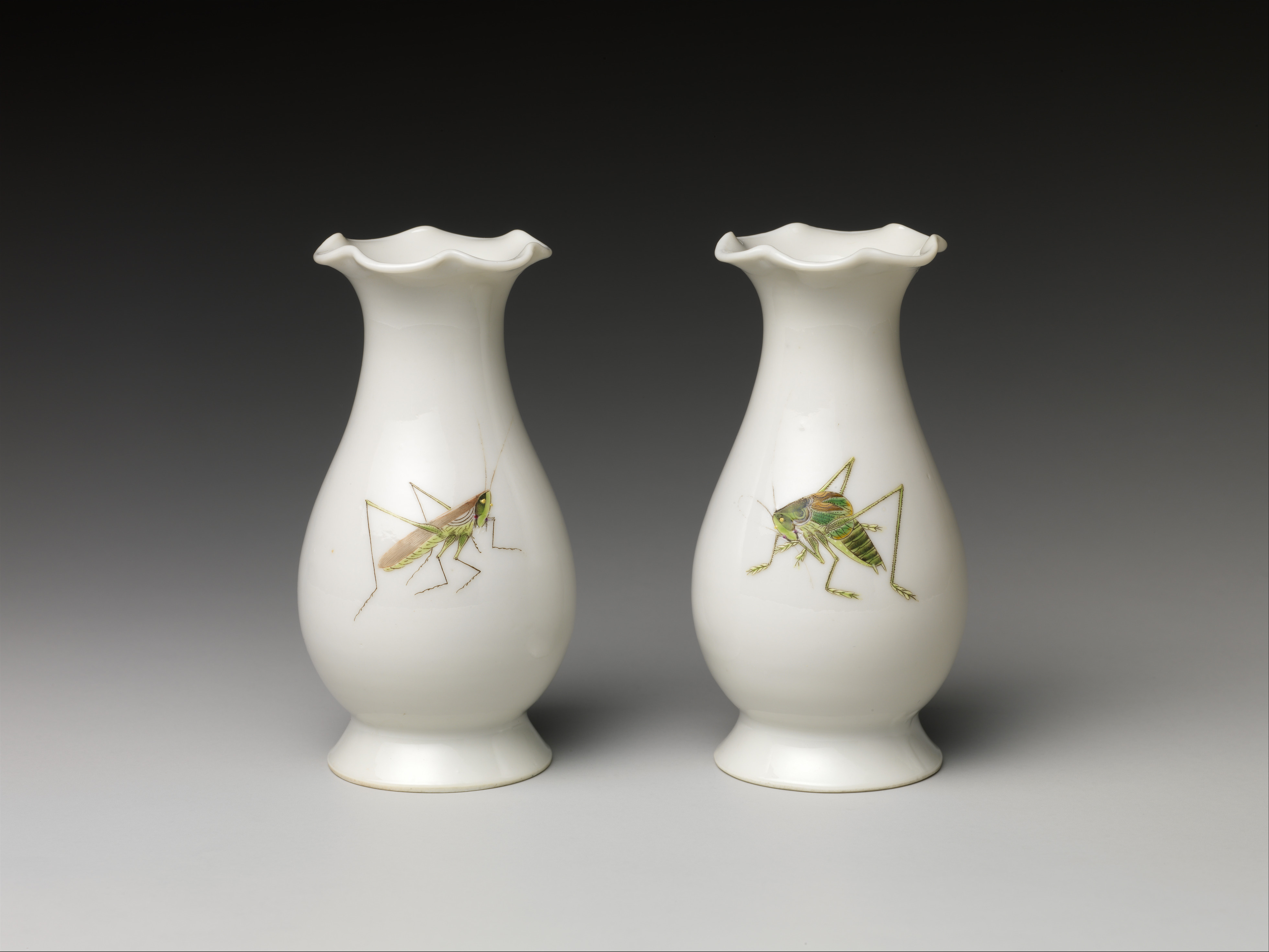
Ware painted with colored enamels over a transparent glaze, Qing dynasty. Metropolitan Museum of Art.

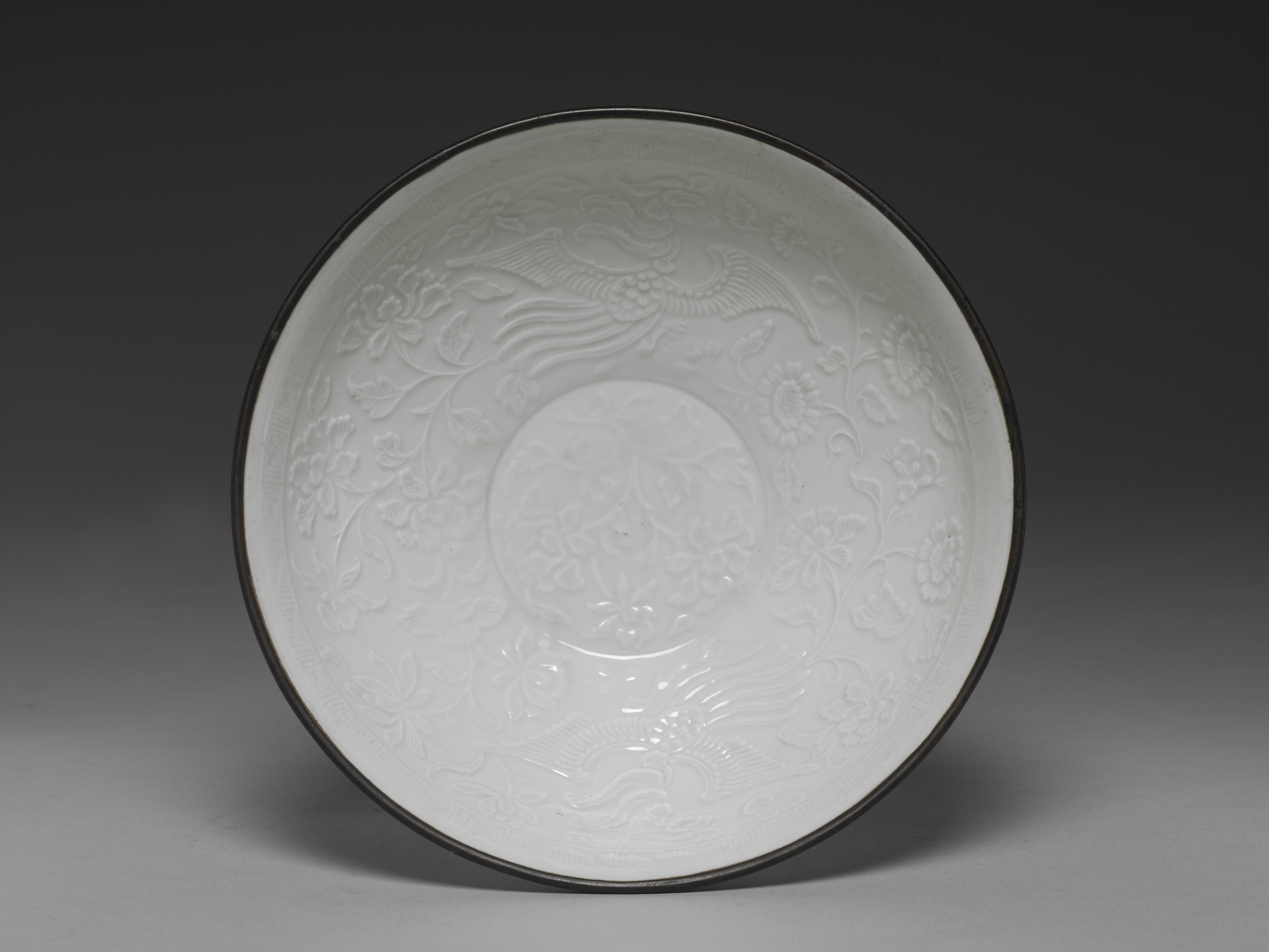
Bowl with impressed paired phoenix design, Qingbai ware, Song–Yuan dynasty. National Palace Museum.

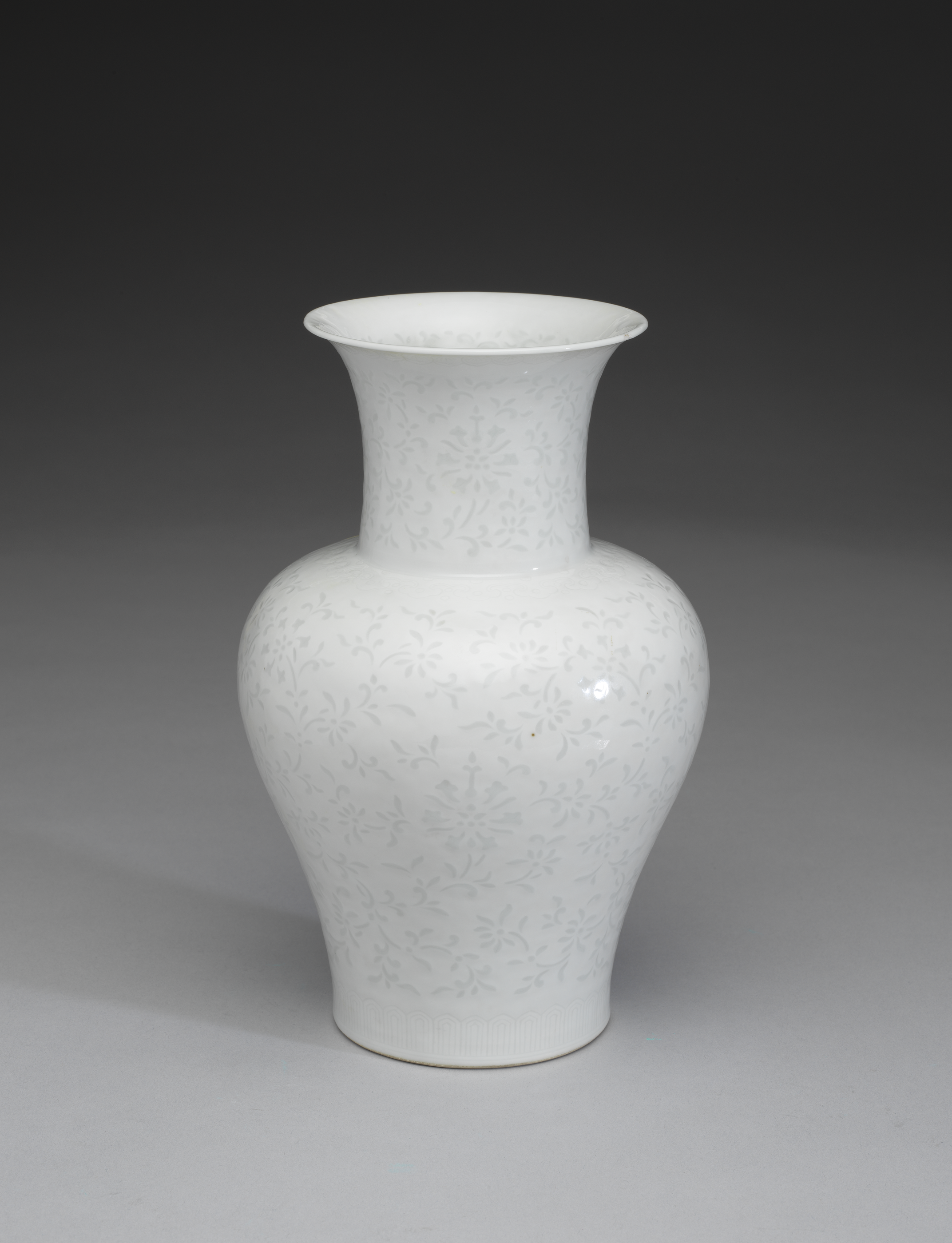
Vase with carved and reticulated (linglong) decoration, Qing dynasty, 18th–19th century. National Palace Museum.

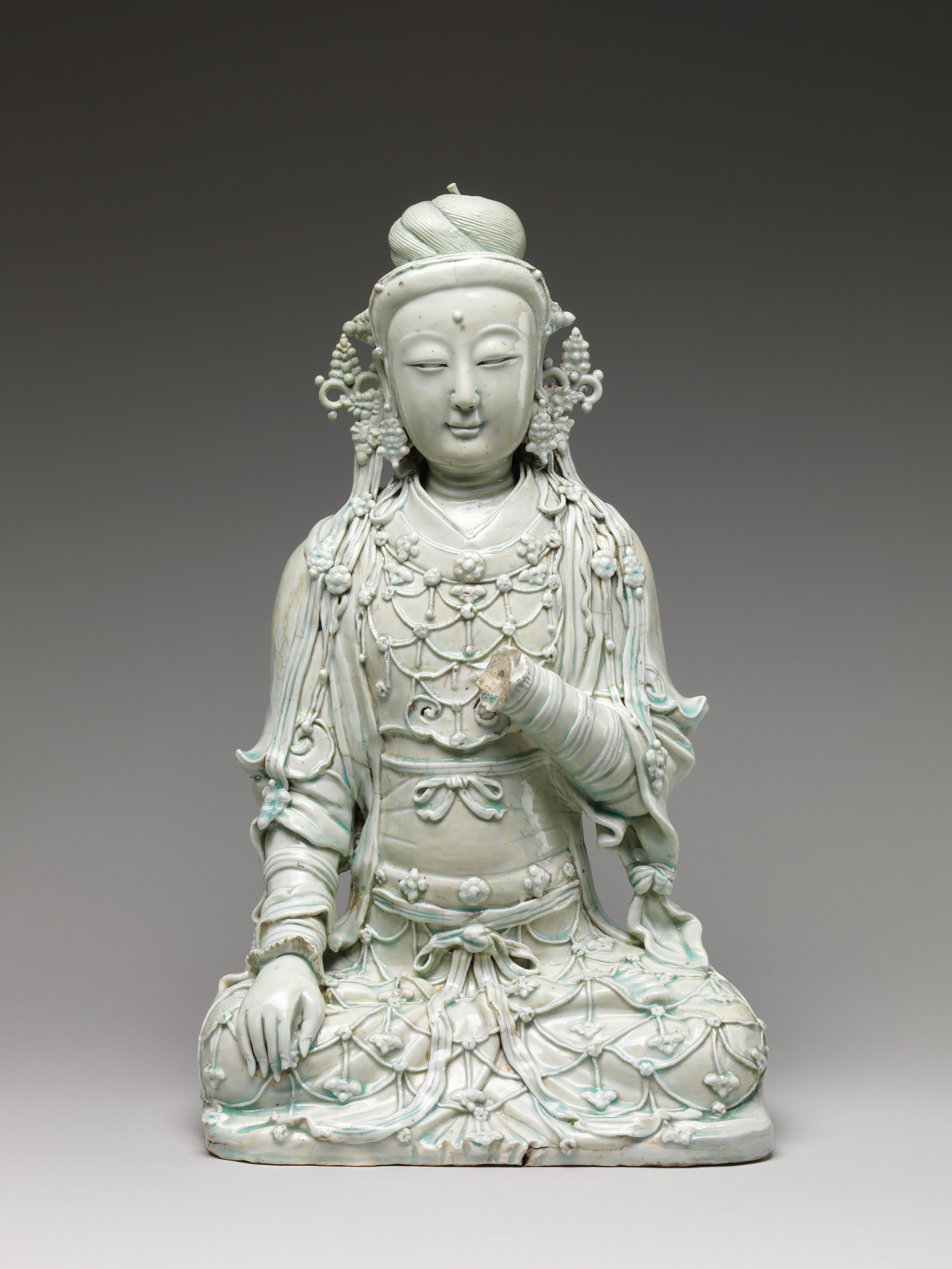
Figure of a bodhisattva, Qingbai ware, Yuan dynasty (14th century). Metropolitan Museum of Art.

=== Jingdezhen blue-and-white porcelain ===
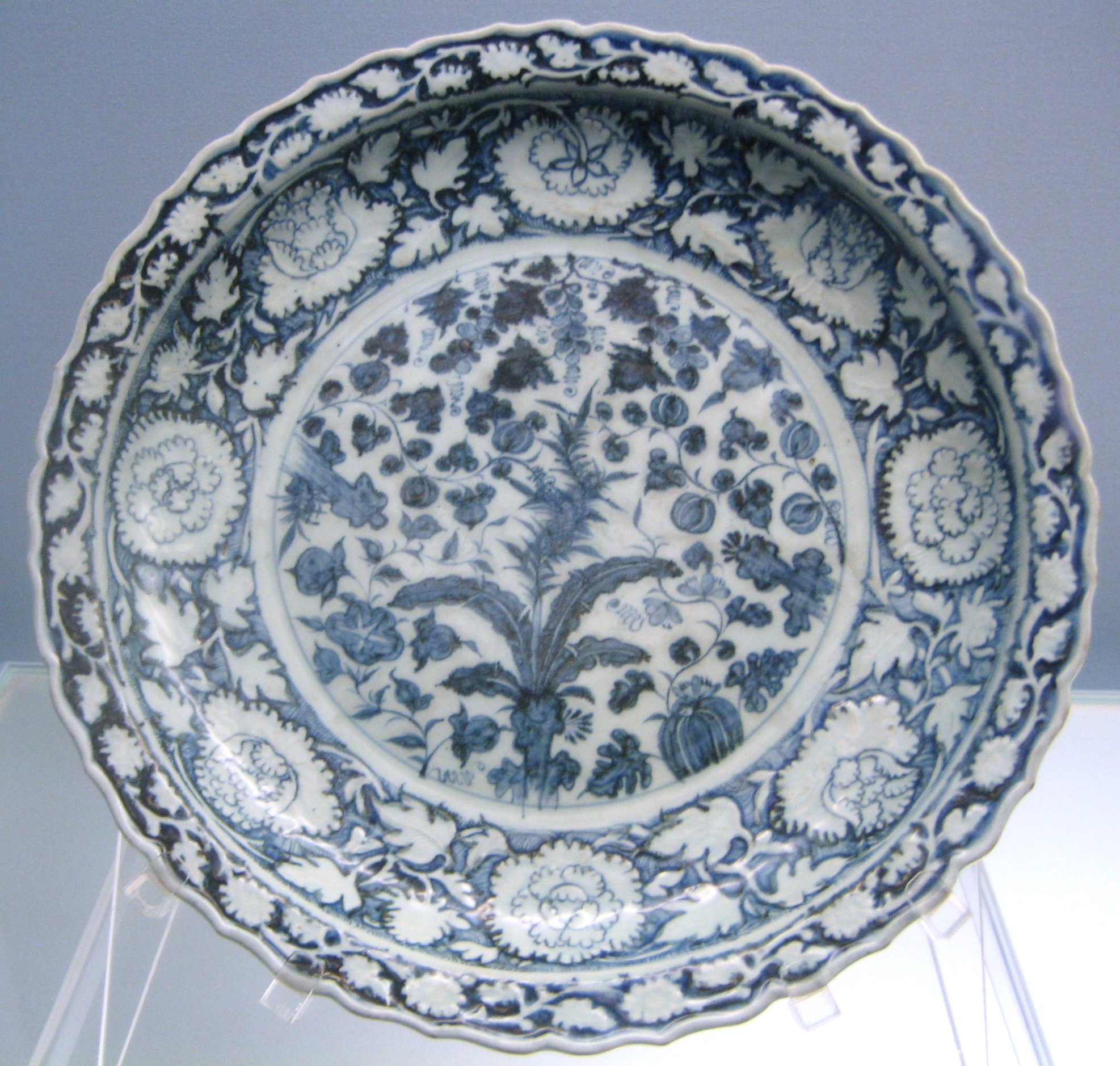
Foliated dish with underglaze blue design of melons, bamboo and grapes, Jingdezhen ware, Yuan, 1271–1368

From the mid-14th century, Jingdezhen began to mass-produce underglaze blue porcelain, whose development it pioneered, making it "one of the world's earliest industrial towns". Much of this was for export, and other styles were produced for the Chinese market. Elaborately-painted wares were not in the traditional court taste, but they evidently came to be accepted. The large round serving-plates, from 40 cm (16 in) across, which are now among the most valued pieces, reflect the needs of Middle Eastern rather than Chinese food service, which generally uses large numbers of smaller and deeper bowls, then as now. Wares for export also often had thicker bodies, to reduce breakages on long travels to the export markets. In early periods, the markets receiving porcelain direct from China included Japan, all of South-East Asia, and much of the Islamic world, but did not include Europe on a regular basis. Until the 17th century, Europe normally only received porcelain via the Islamic world.

The blue pigment was derived from cobalt oxide, which had been imported sporadically from Persia in earlier periods. From the 14th century regular imports of the pigment were obtained from Persia. The cobalt was ground and mixed with a medium, then painted onto the dried bodies of the pots, which were then glazed and fired. At a later date a source of cobalt was found within China; this differed from the Persian ore in the proportion of associated manganese. The colour on the fired pots was a grey-blue rather than a pure blue. By mixing three parts Persian ore to two parts Chinese a rich and soft blue was produced, which became labelled as 'Sumatran' or 'Muhammadan' blue.

One of the largest intact early collections of exported Chinese porcelain was at the Ardabil Shrine, and is now in the National Museum of Iran. This has 805 pieces of porcelain, donated by Shah Abbas I in 1607–1608, from the Persian royal collection. Most were made in Jingdezhen, and they covered the full period of blue and white wares to that point, with some nearly 300 years old when donated. The largely intact Ottoman collection is mostly in Topkapi Palace.

The restriction of painted subjects to the combination of abstract geometrical patterns, plant-forms, and animals had begun to end during the first half of the 15th century, as human figures, landscape scenes and other subjects began to appear. In the best wares, these designs were supplied by court artists and reflected contemporary painting and other media. This trend continued in Transitional porcelain, produced for a period up to 1683 at the end of the Ming dynasty, and the later blue and white wares of the Kangxi reign are the final phase in the artistic development of blue and white, with superb technical quality in the best objects, and larger images, flexibly treated, on a wide variety of subjects.

Tianqi porcelain is a type of relatively informal ware, largely destined for the Japanese market, made at Jingdezhen in the 17th century. Kraak ware is a type of Jingdezhen export porcelain produced mainly during the Wanli reign (1573–1620), but also in the remaining two Ming reigns. It was among the first Chinese ware to arrive in Europe in mass quantities. Strictly defined, it "is distinguished by the arrangement of its ornament into panels; these usually radiate to a bracketed rim notorious for its liability to chip". It was mostly made as "deep bowls and wide dishes", decorated with motifs from nature, in a style not used on wares for the domestic Chinese market.

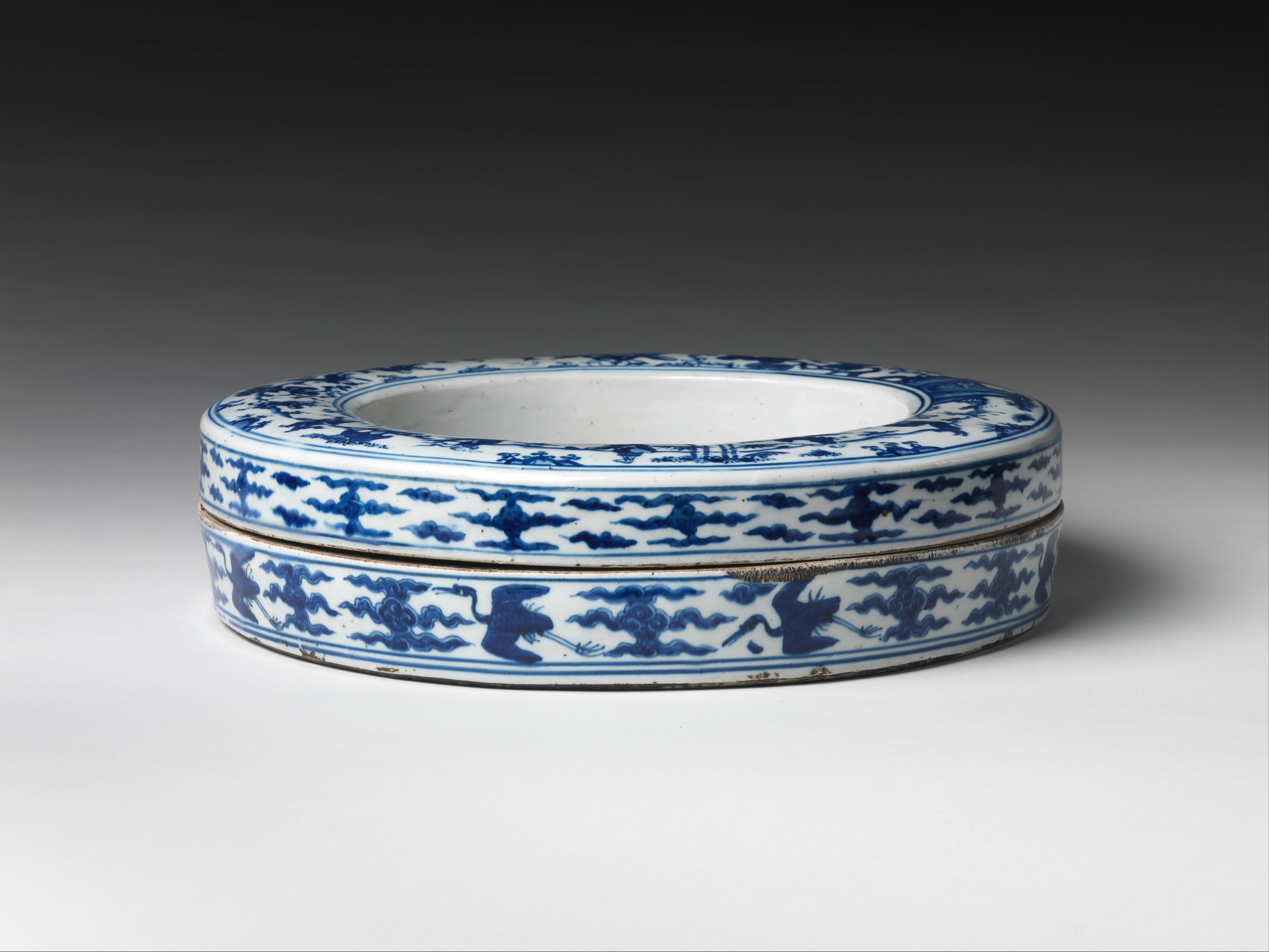
Jingdezhen blue and white covered box, Ming dynasty, Jiajing period (mid-16th century). Metropolitan Museum of Art.

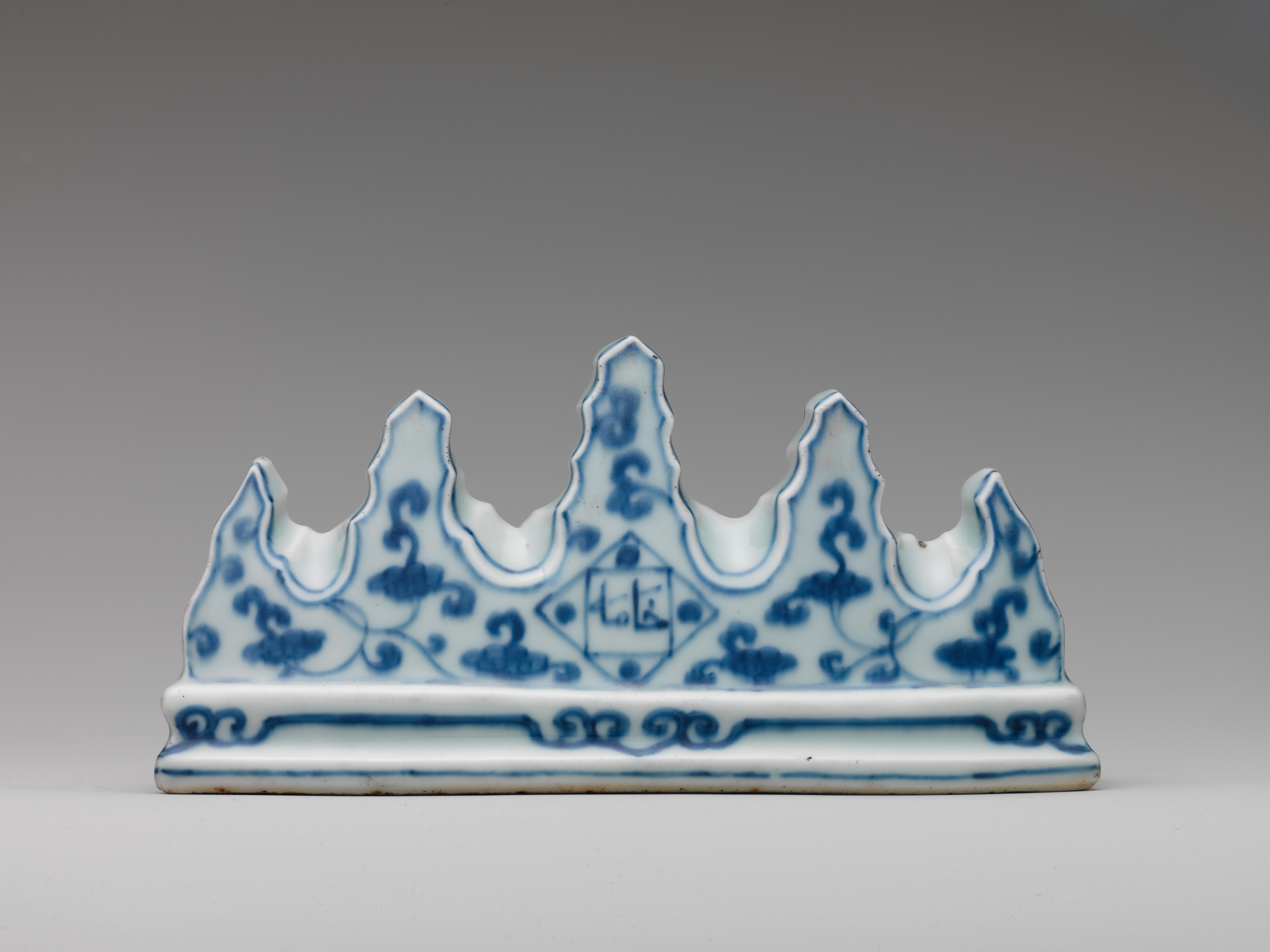
Jingdezhen blue and white brush rest, Ming dynasty, Zhengde period (early 16th century). Metropolitan Museum of Art.

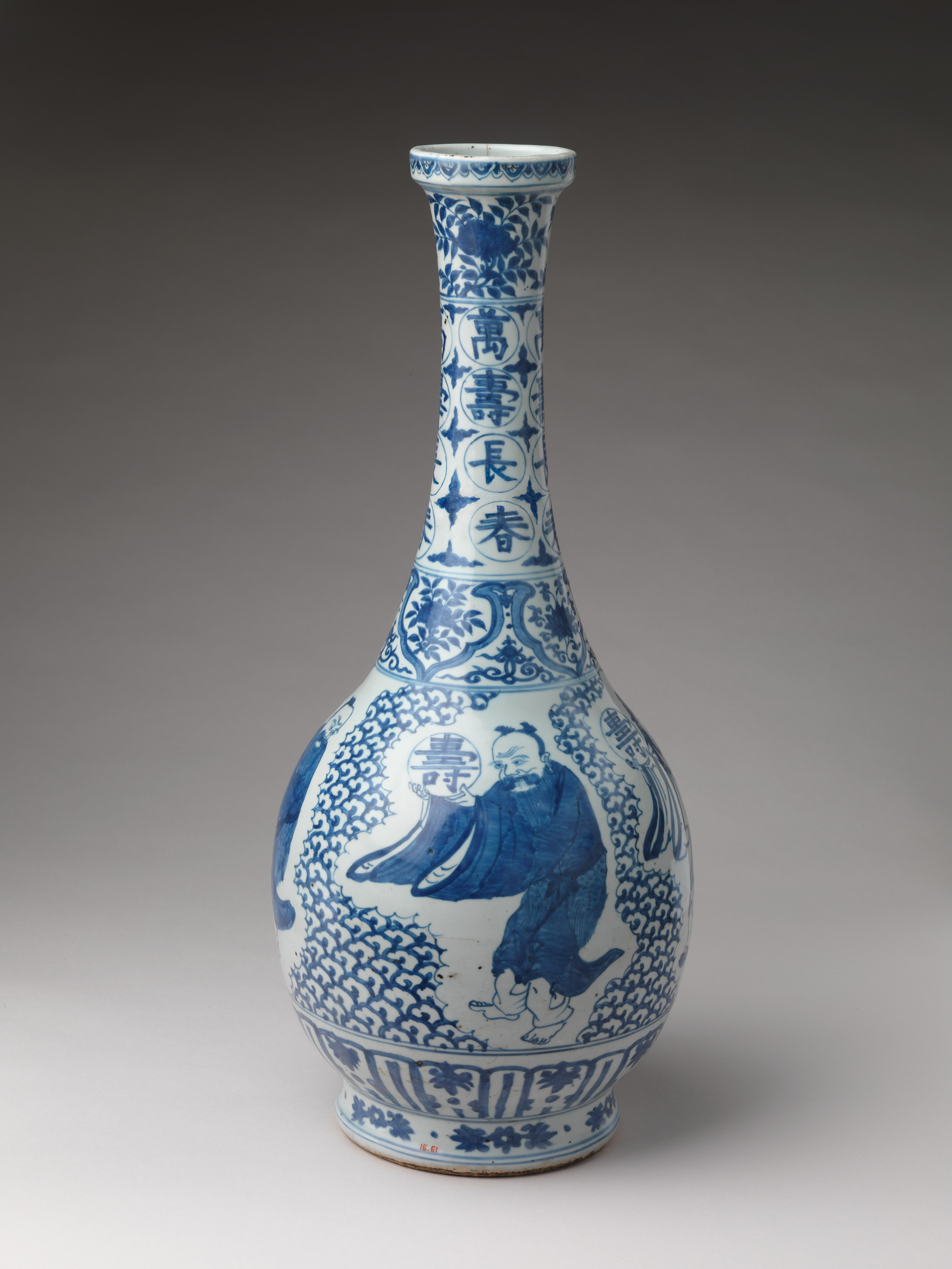
Jingdezhen blue and white vase, late Ming–early Qing dynasty (late 16th–17th century). Metropolitan Museum of Art.

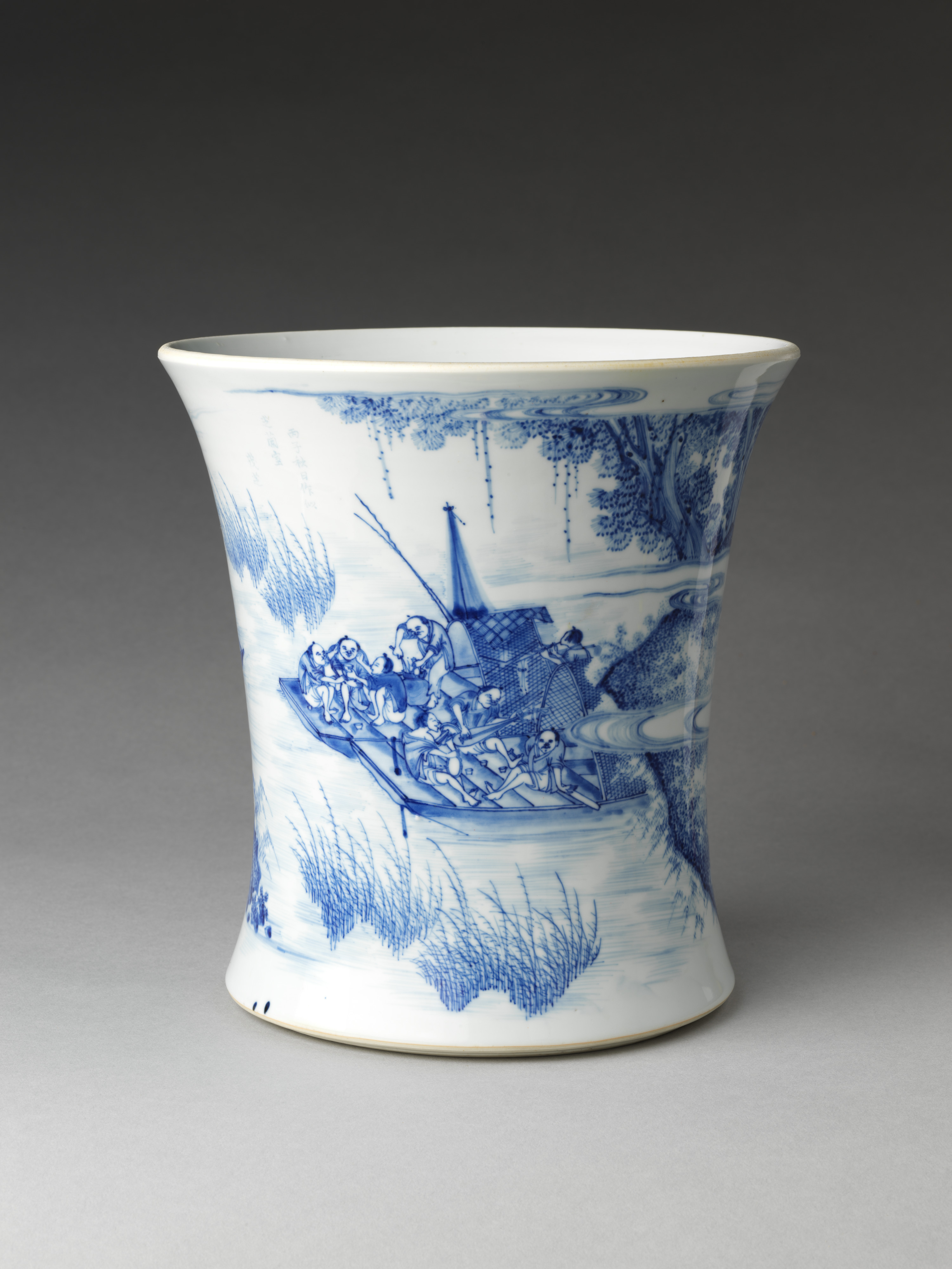
Jingdezhen blue and white brush holder depicting Wang Qing crossing the river from "Water Margin", Ming–Qing dynasty (dated 1636 or 1696). Metropolitan Museum of Art.

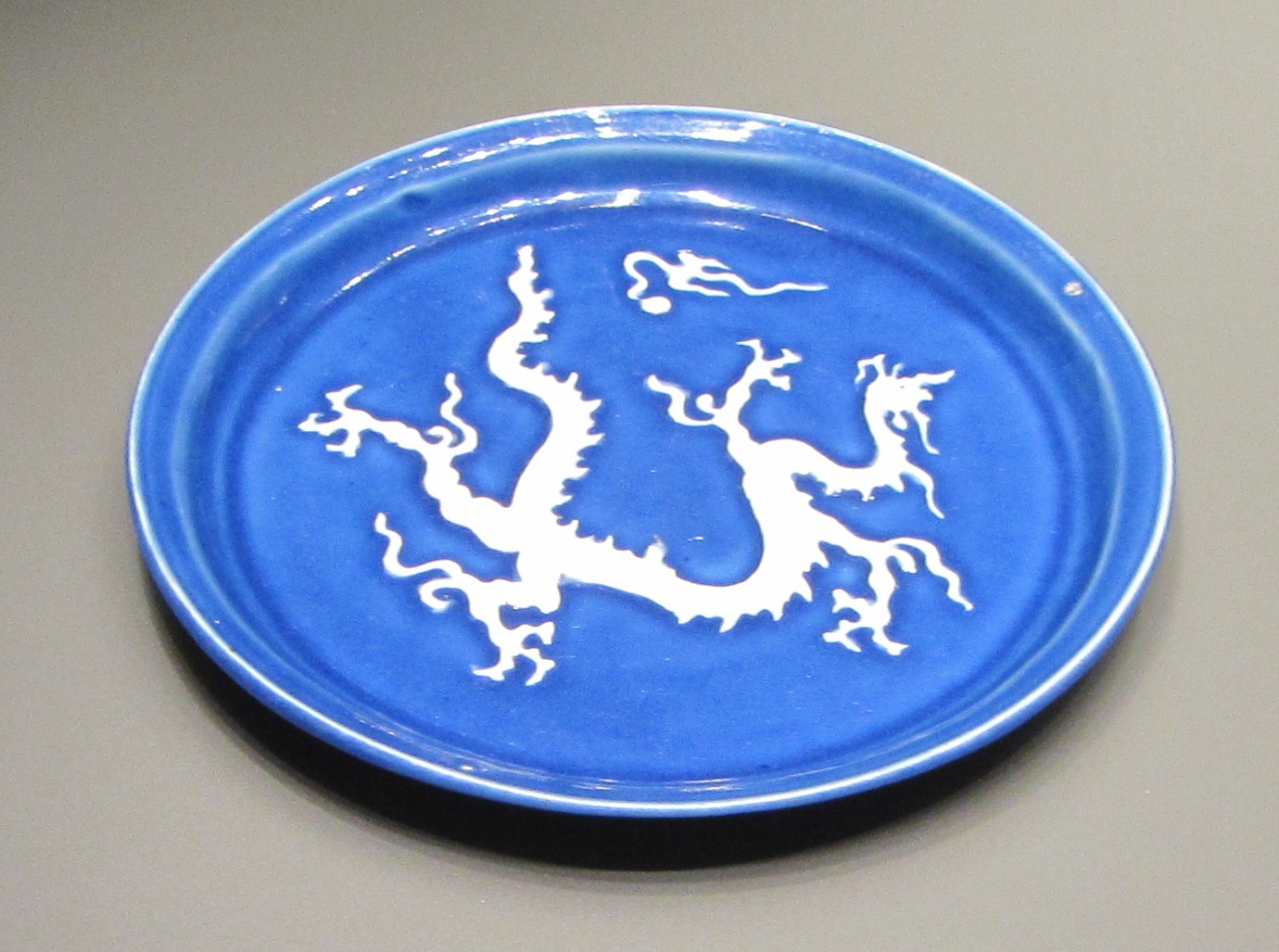
Yuan dynasty dish with a white dragon and pearl design on a monochrome blue background

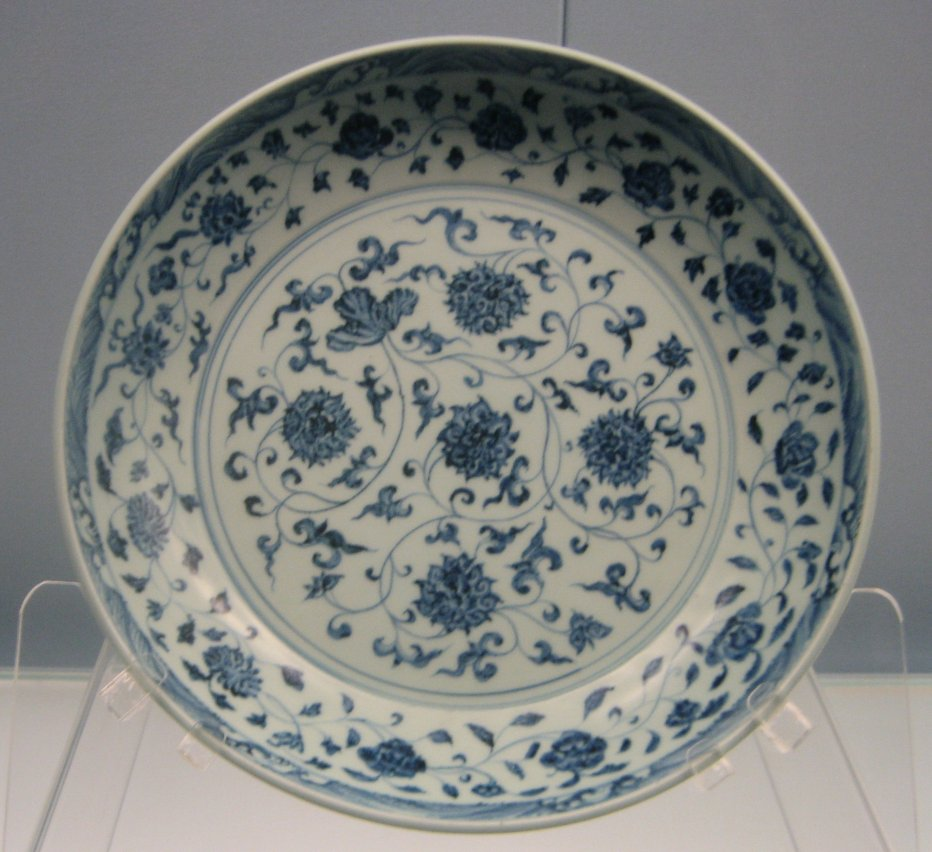
Dish with underglaze blue design of interlaced flowers, Xuande Reign 1426–1435, Ming

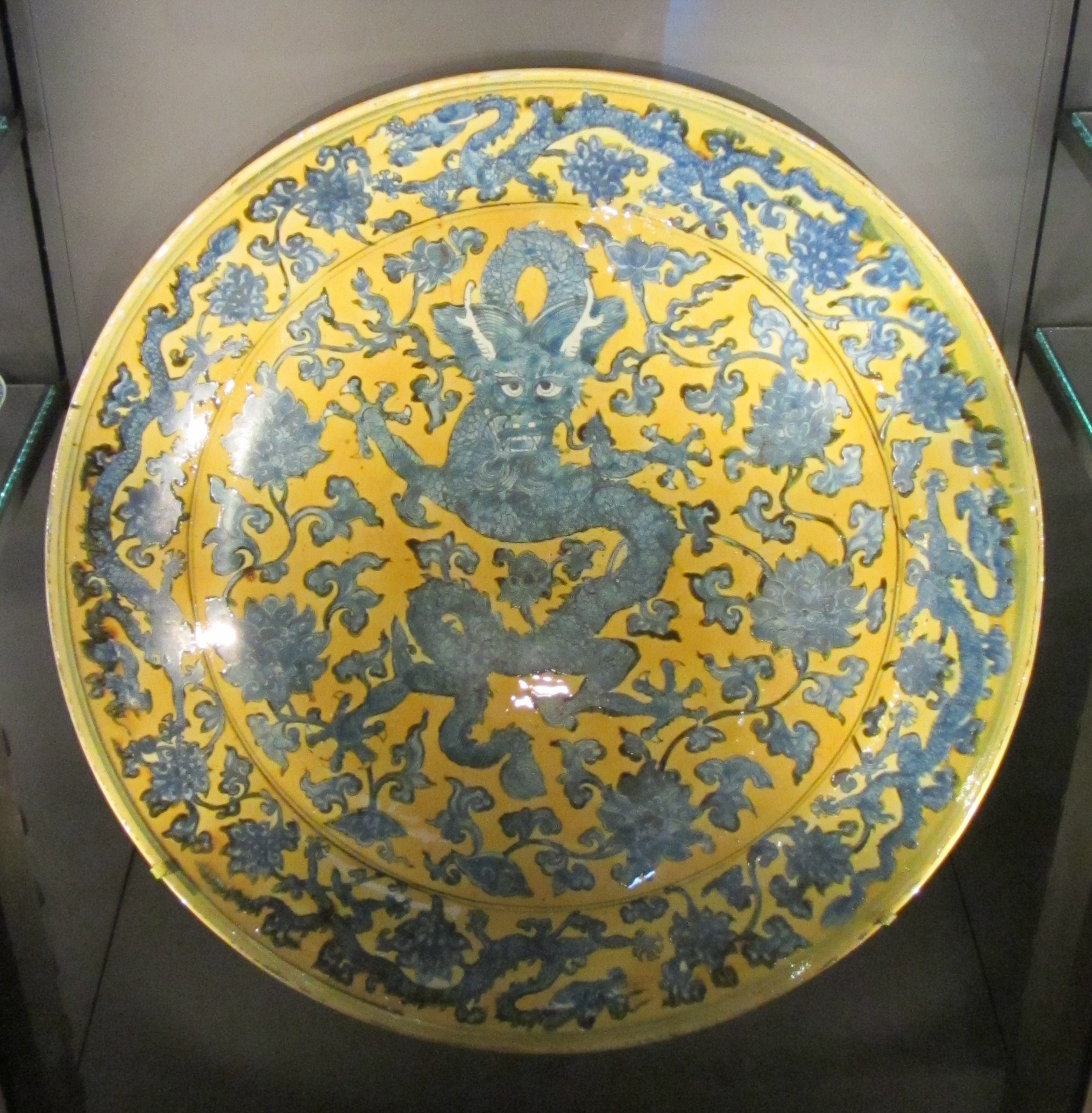
Dish with underglaze blue dragon and yellow enamel, Ming

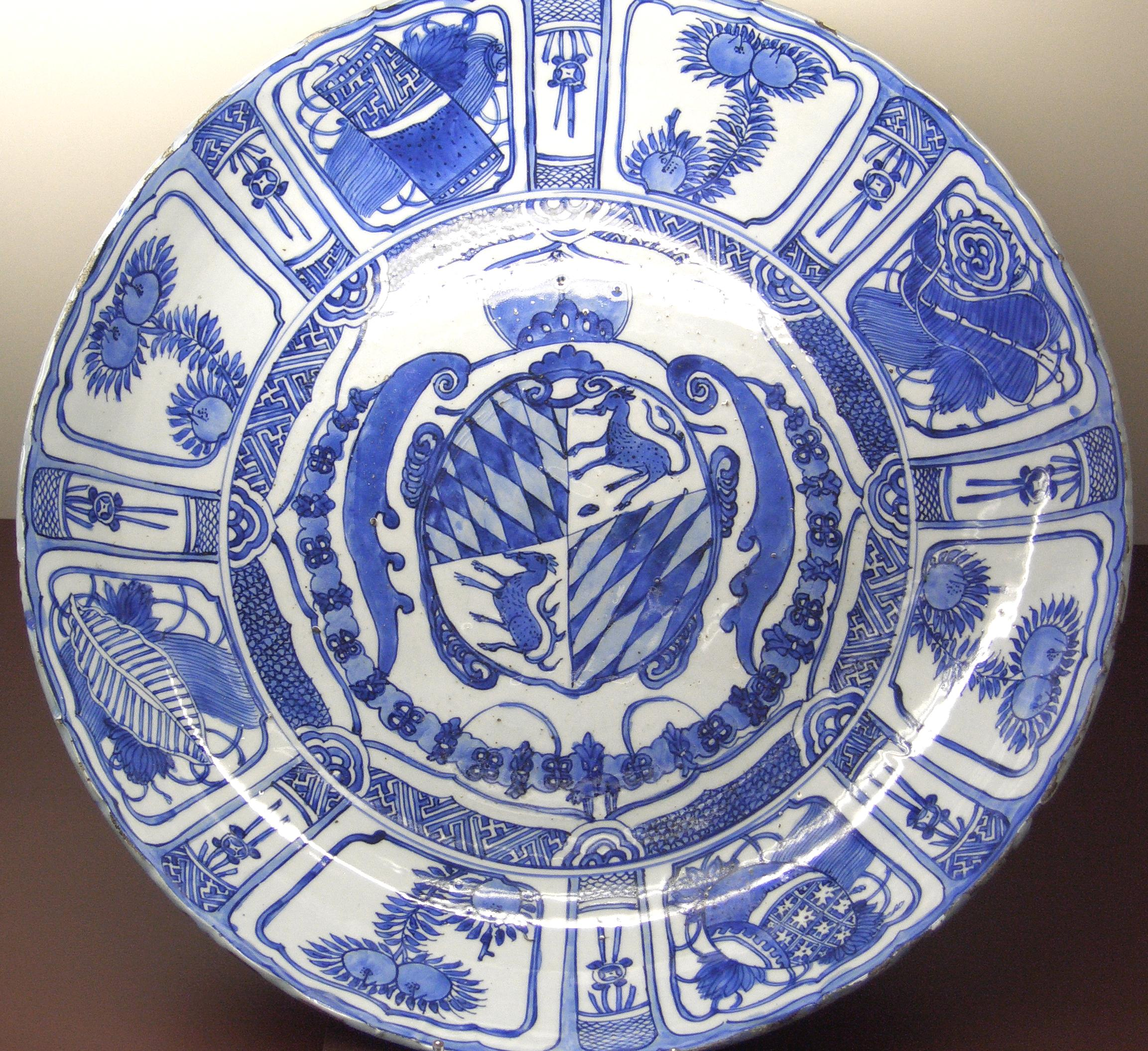
Kraak ware dish; relatively unusually it is armorial porcelain, for the Wittelsbach family. Wanli reign

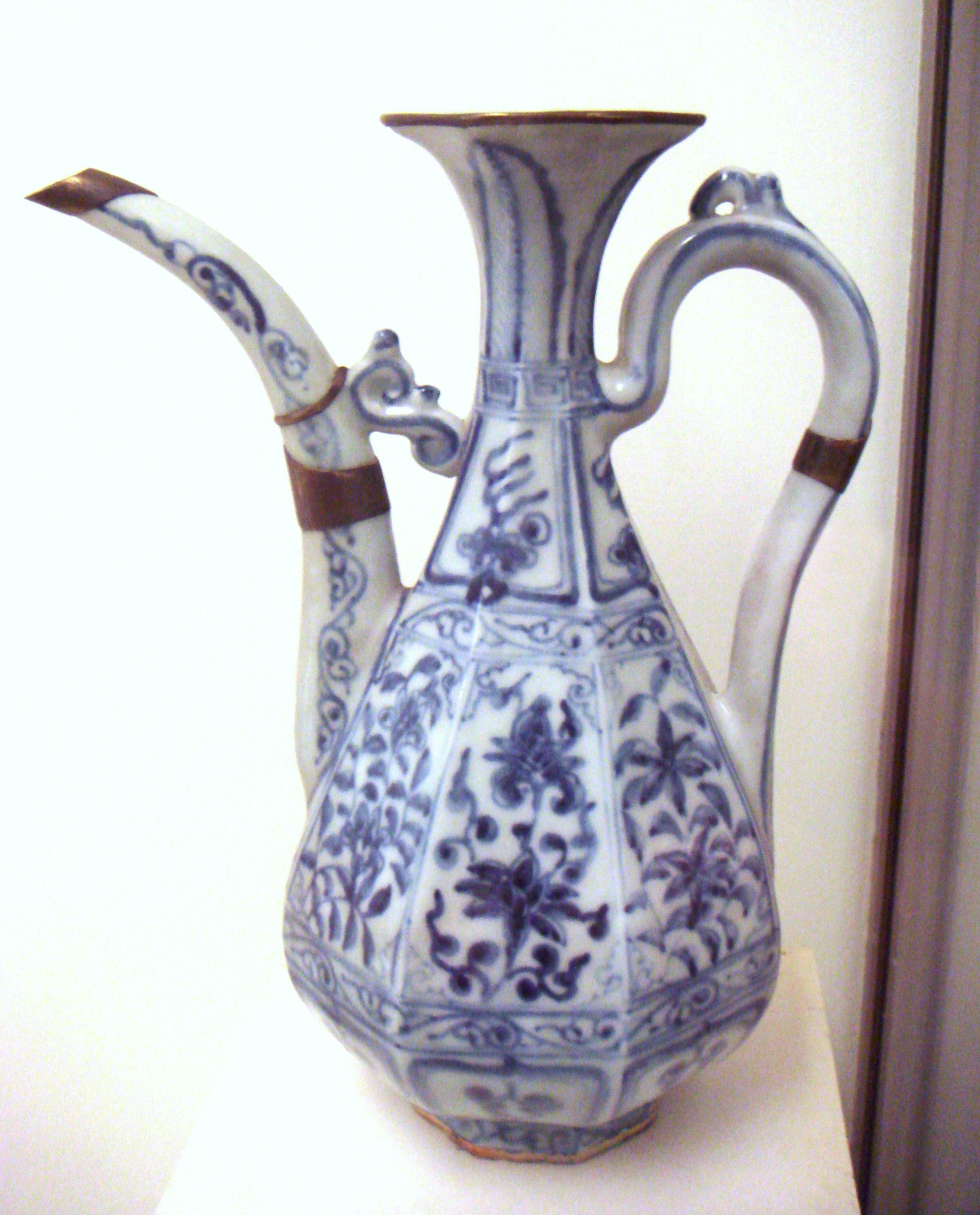
Early blue and white porcelain, c. 1335, the shape from Islamic metalwork

== Organization during the Qing period ==
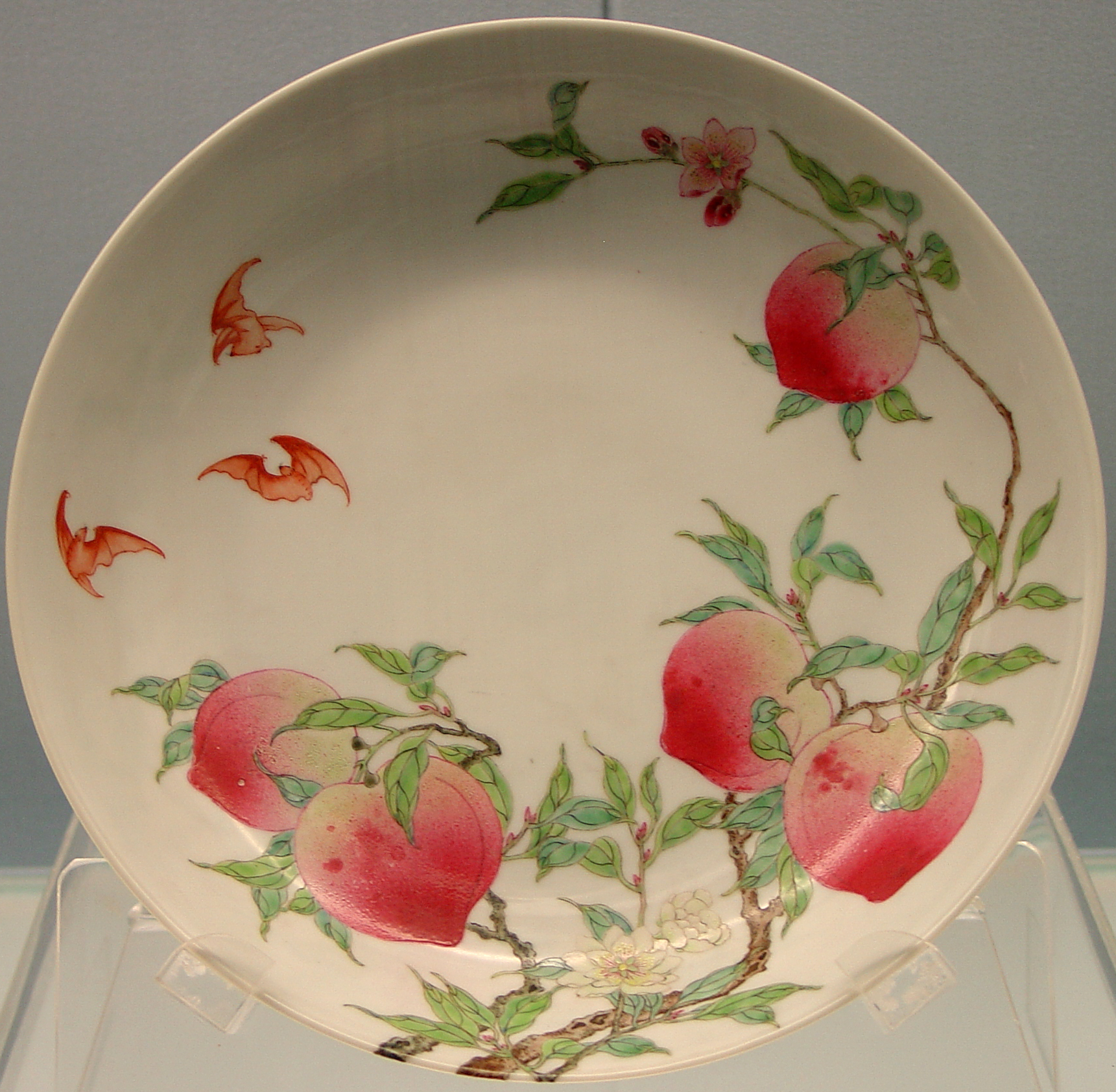
Famille rose dish with peaches and bats. Qing, Yongzheng reign (1723–1735)

During the Qing period production became more varied, with a wide spread of styles and qualities, from imperial wares, through those for export, to those for a popular domestic market. The dozens of non-imperial kilns are known as "private", with a few "official old kilns" making very high-quality wares for the Chinese nobility, which were "often as fine in quality as the imperial pieces and had the added attraction of more adventurous decoration since court styles were prescribed and rather formal"; at times these may have helped the imperial kilns with large orders. The rest supplied various levels of the Chinese domestic and export markets. Early in the period the original local source of clay ran out, and new diggings were begun.

The French Jesuit François Xavier d'Entrecolles visited Jingdezhen and wrote to Europe about its processes between 1712 and 1721; he also gave the Chinese useful information about European pigments. From this period Europe began its own porcelain industry, which grew rapidly, initially by imitating Chinese styles, and later by developing their own styles. Persia, Vietnam, Japan and several countries in South-East Asia had long been imitating Jingdezhen ware. Towards the end of the century, exports to Europe were in decline, replaced by local wares.

In 1726 Nian Xiyao was appointed by the Beijing court as controller at Jingdezhen, the first centrally-appointed official since 1680. He was also appointed controller for a customs barrier 400 miles to the north at Huai'an on the Grand Canal, which resulted in Nian only being able to visit Jingdezhen once a year. In 1728 a member of the imperial household staff, Tang Ying, was appointed resident assistant at Jingdezhen. Tang replaced Nian in 1735 when the latter was accused of corruption, and he became one of the most influential of the superintendents.

In 1739 the customs office was moved to Jiujiang 90 miles west of Jingdezhen; Tang continued in the dual post until recalled to Beijing in 1743 by the Qianlong emperor. At court he was assigned the task of annotating twenty illustrations of the porcelain industry from the imperial library. Returning to Jingdezhen he stayed there, except for a brief period between 1750 and 1752, until his death at 75 years old in 1756.

Wares bearing Tang Ying's name survive; these include two pairs of blue-and-white candlesticks bearing dates of 1740 and 1741, the latter of which bears an inscription describing him as "Controller of Pottery in Jiangxi" amongst other official titles. Tang also wrote a number of books including A Complete Record of Pots (1735), Mental Notes of a Pottery Worker (1738) and Illustrated Explanation of the Miracles of the God of the Furnace (1747). His list of wares manufactured for the court runs to sixty types, some of which were recreations of styles of earlier periods.

From the late 18th century, much of Jingdezhen's production was Canton porcelain, using "blanks" made, glazed, and fired at Jingdezhen but then taken to be decorated with enamels in Guangzhou (then usually romanized as Canton) for export to the west via the Thirteen Factories of the Canton System.

In 1905 a European visitor reported that most production was in a short summer season, when workers from surrounding areas came to live in "barrack-like sheds" in the city, without their families. This influx took the population of the city to about 400,000, and caused some social problems.

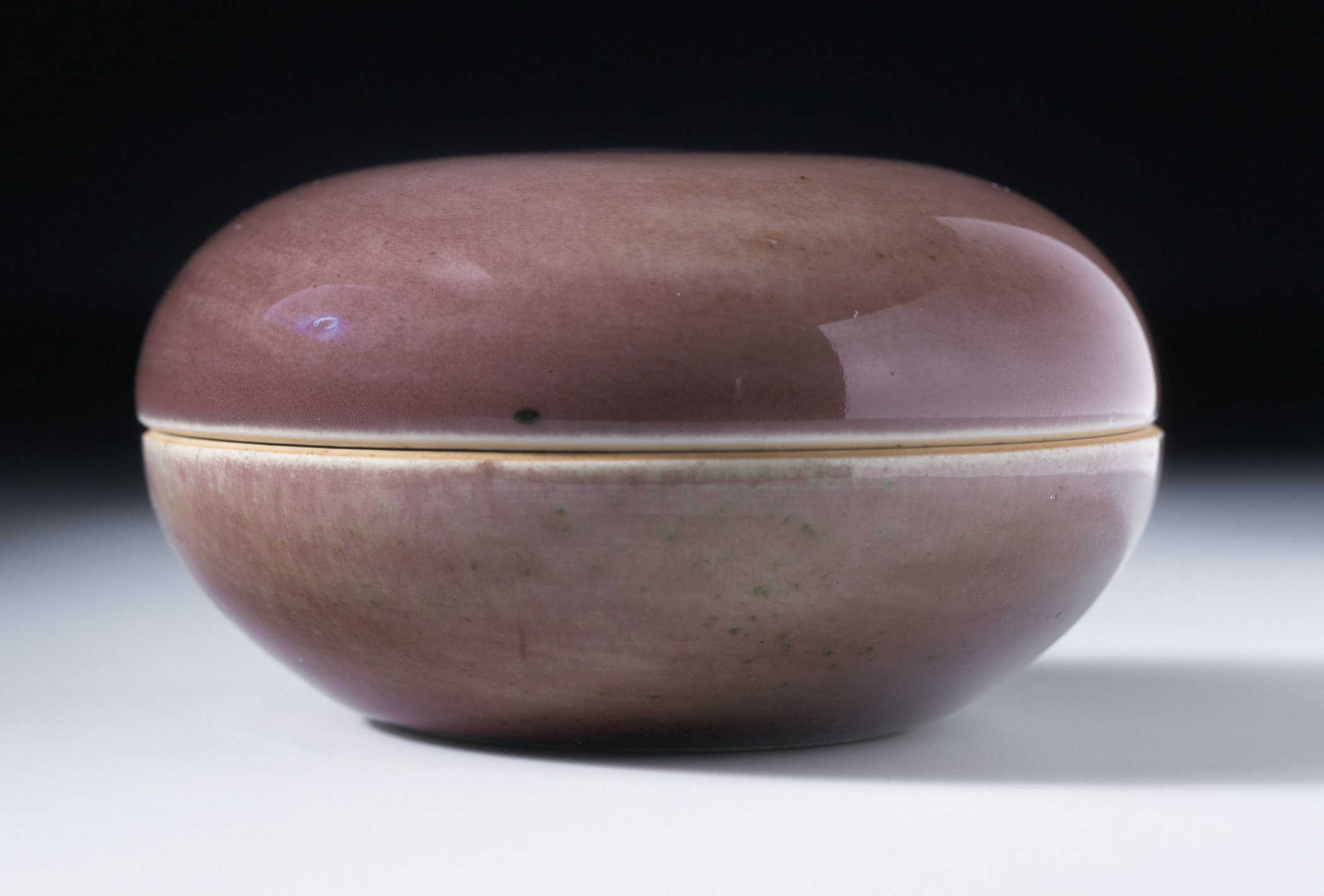
Peach-bloom glazed seal paste box, Kangxi reign 1662–1722; one of the most difficult glaze effects

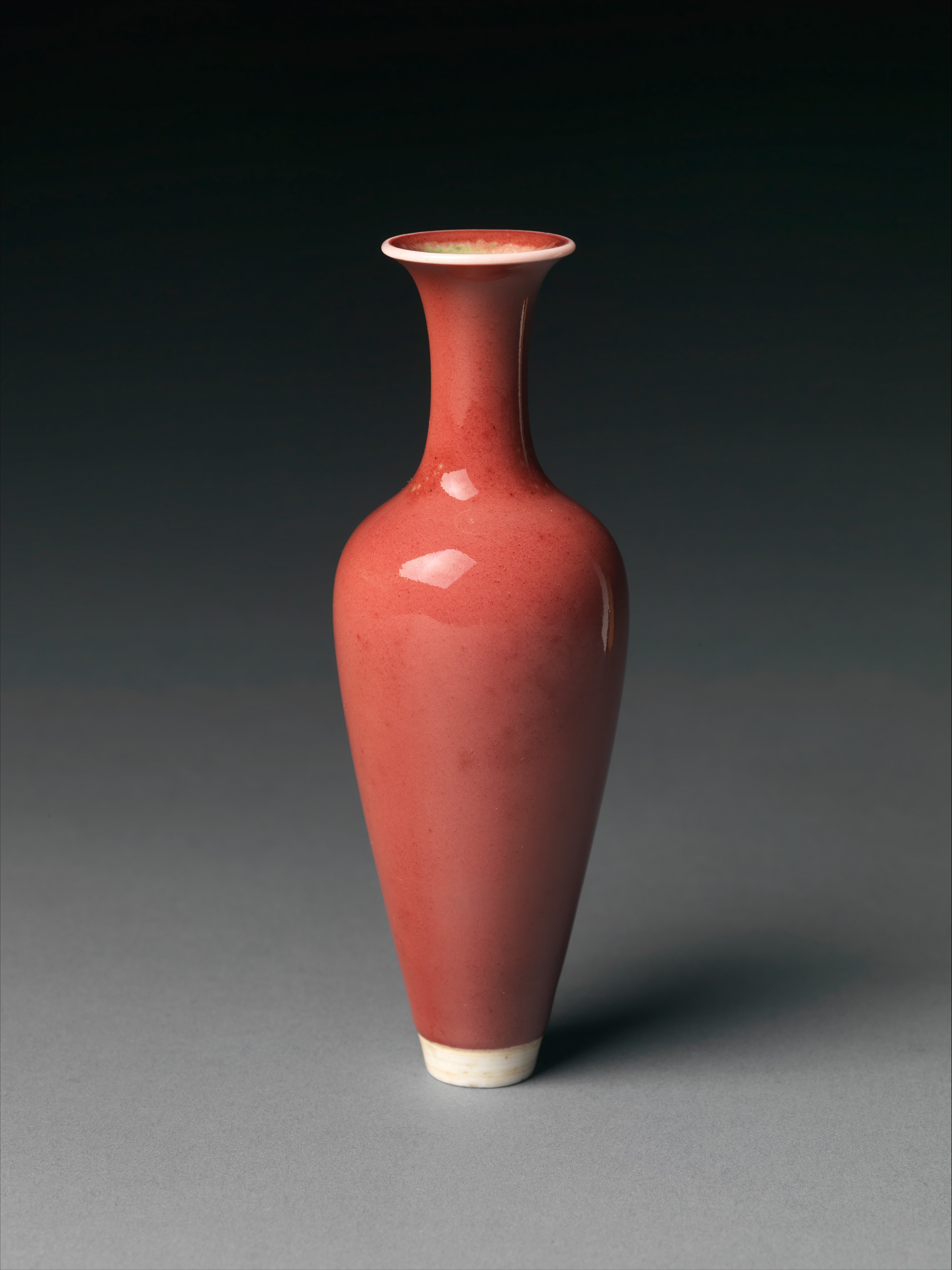
Jingdezhen vase with peachbloom glaze, Qing dynasty, Kangxi period (1678–1688). Metropolitan Museum of Art.

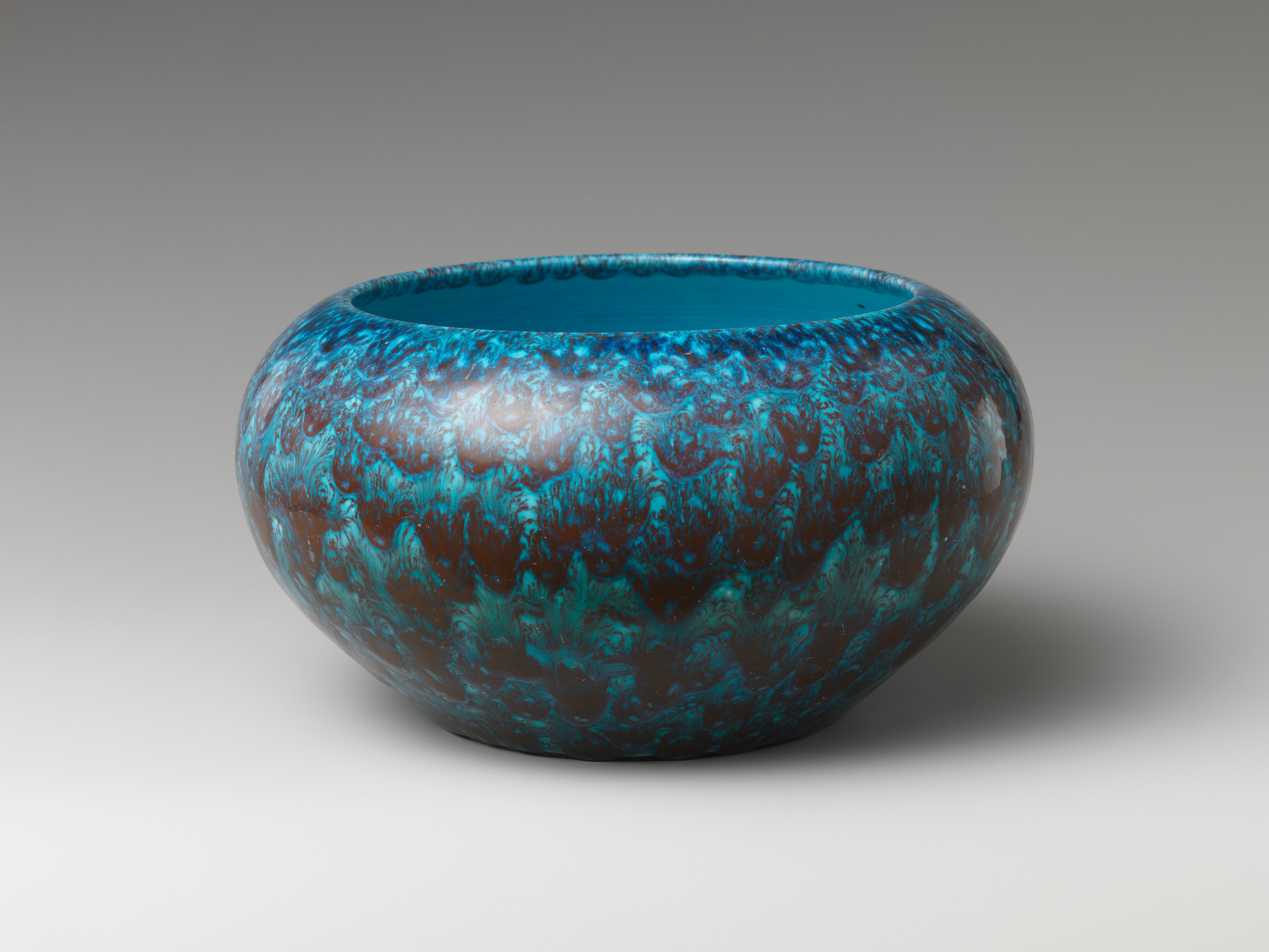
Jingdezhen bowl with peacock feather glaze, Qing dynasty, Kangxi period (early 18th century). Metropolitan Museum of Art.

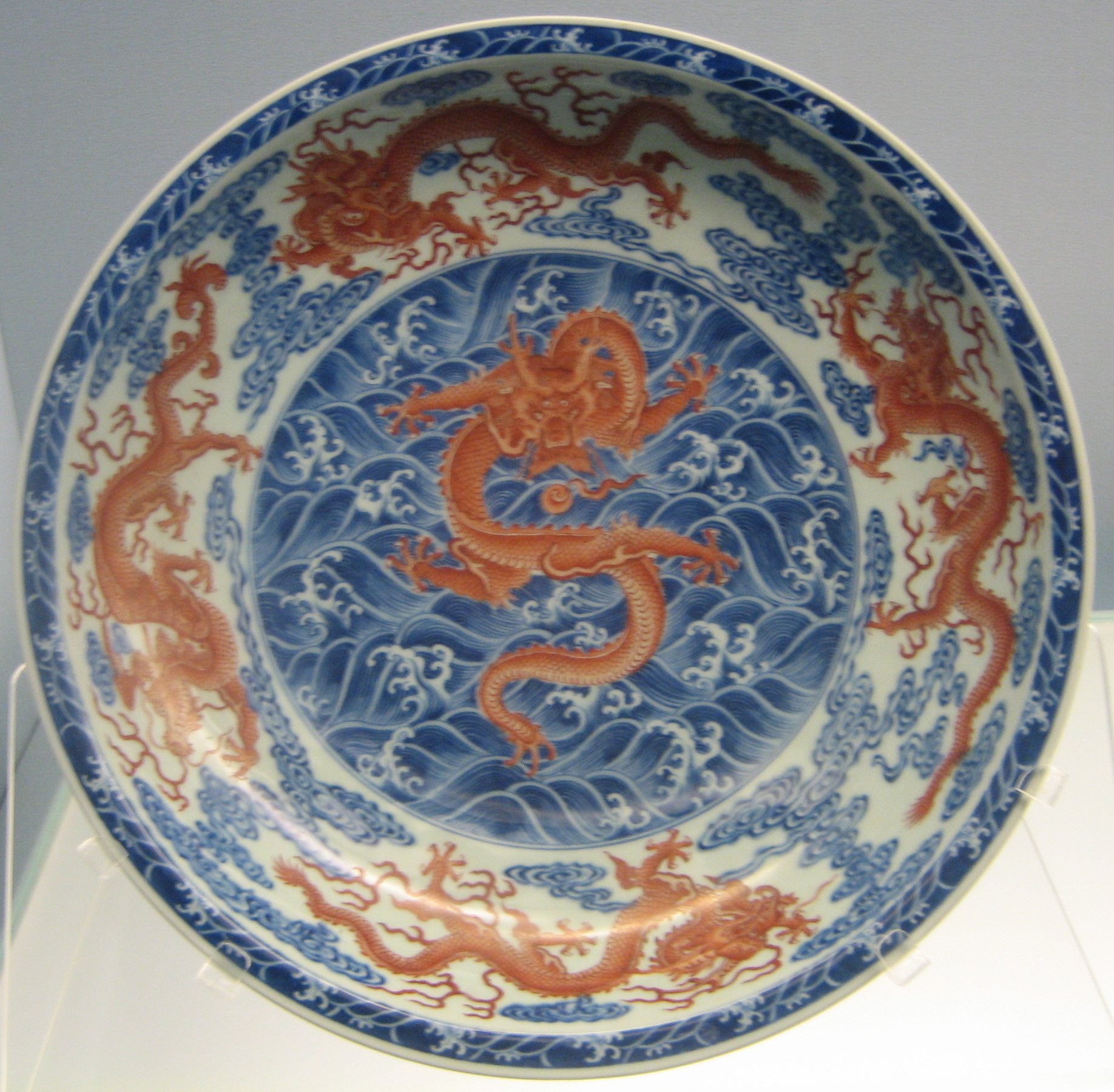
Dish with underglaze blue and overglaze red design of clouds and dragons, Yongzheng reign 1723–1735

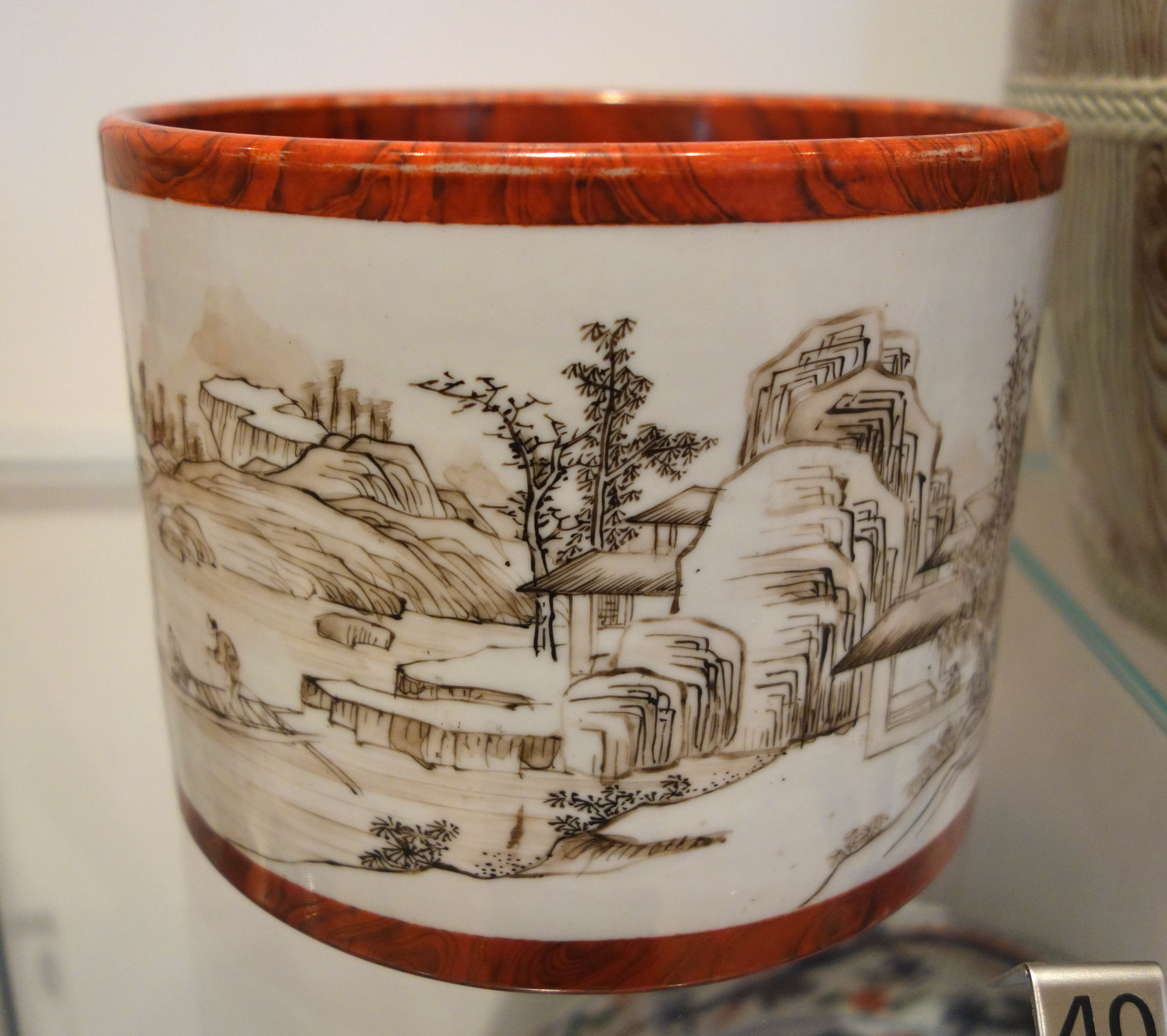
Brush pot, Yongzheng period, 1723–1735

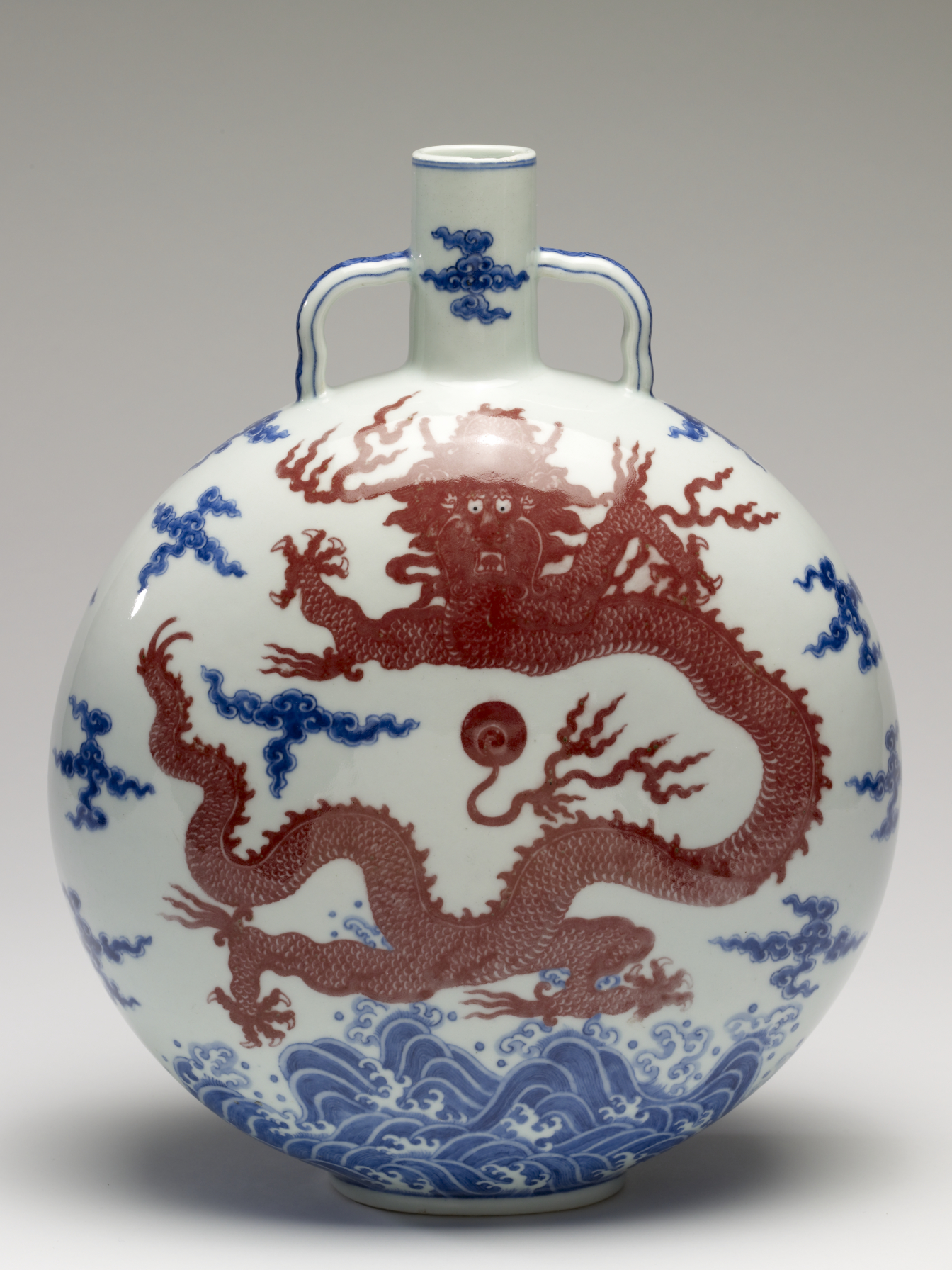
Flask in underglaze blue and red, Qianlong emperor

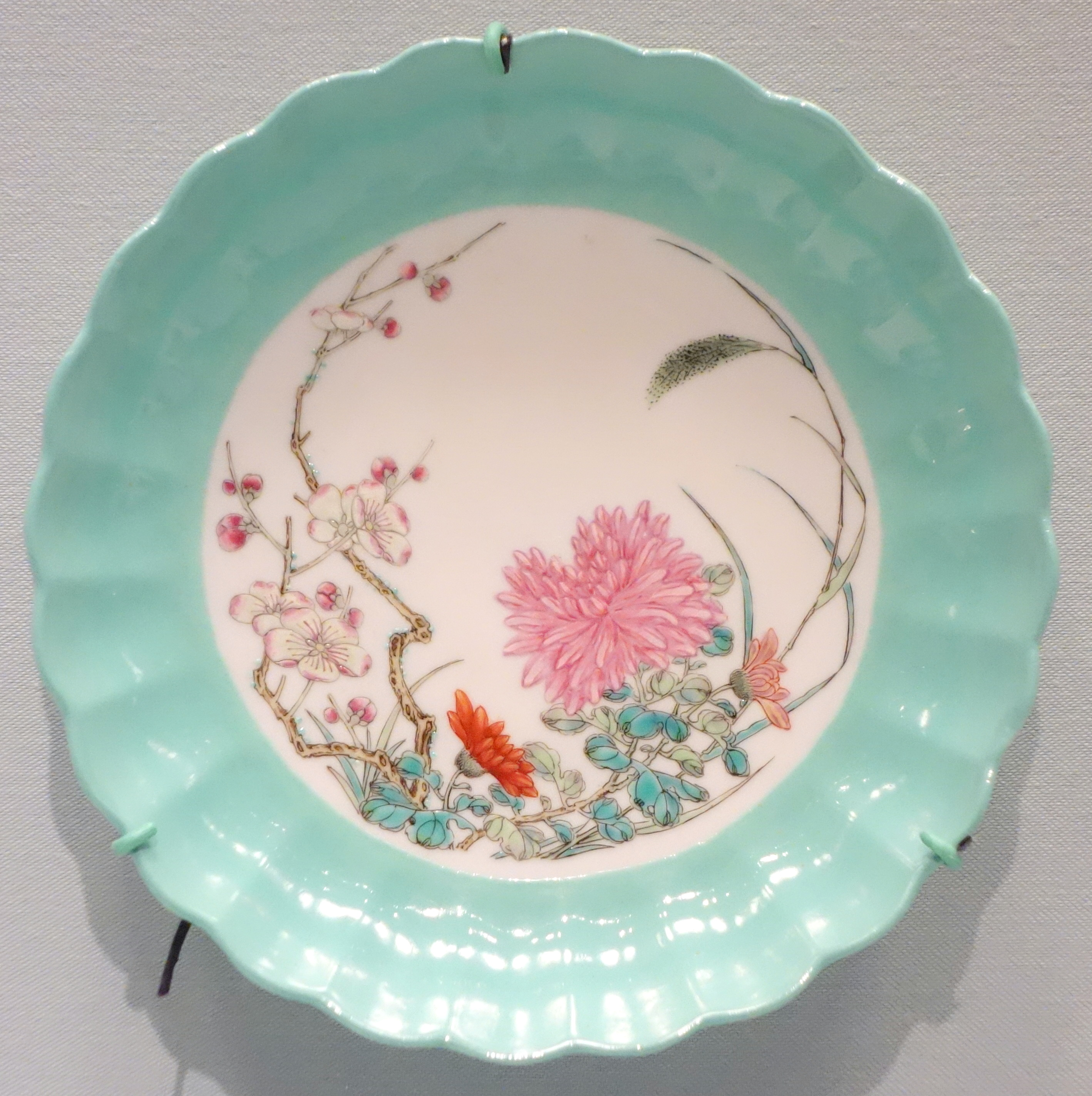
Lobed dish with flowers, Qianlong emperor, porcelain with overglaze enamel

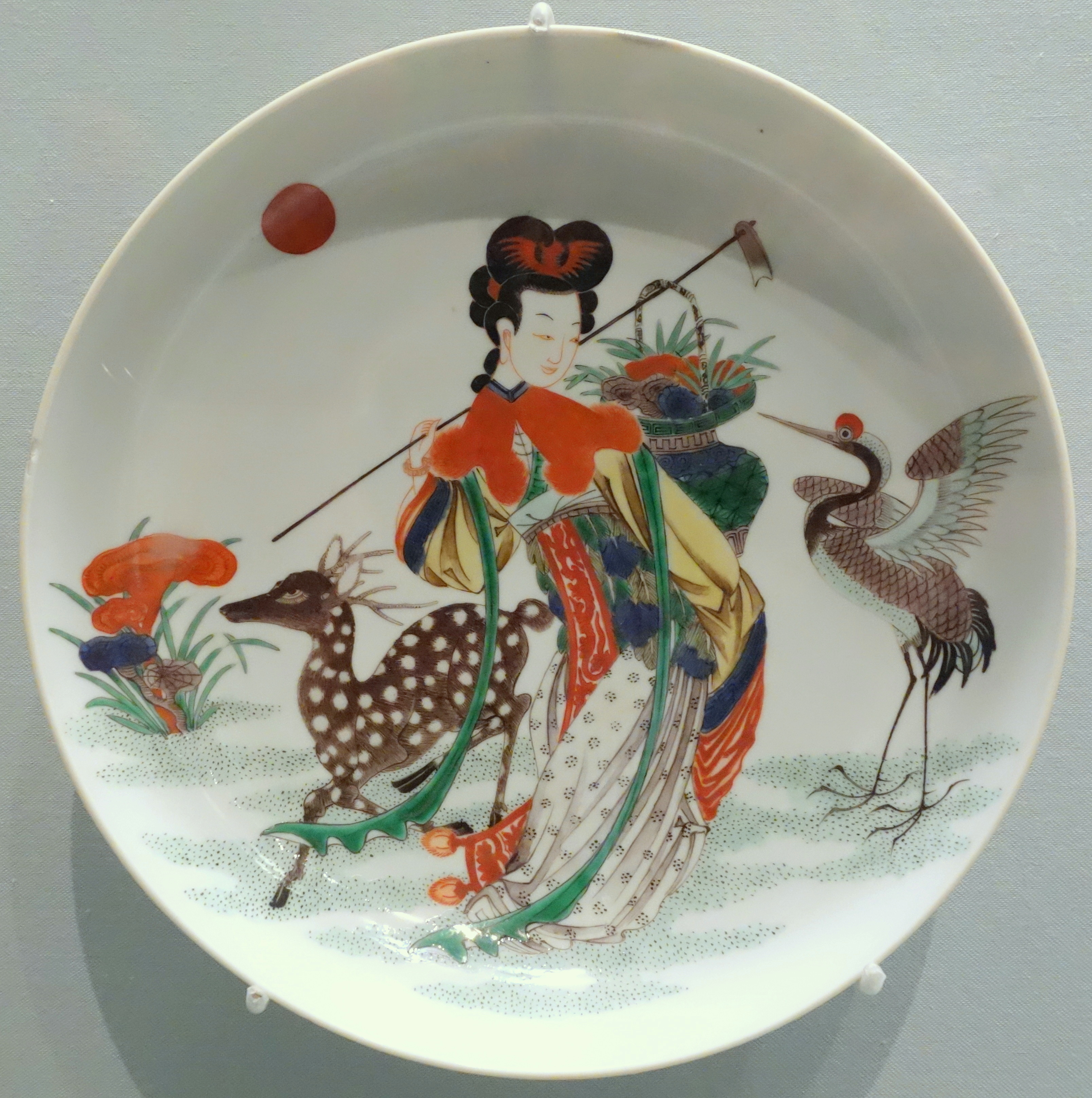
Dish with Magu, deity of longevity, Qing dynasty, c. 1700–1800 AD, porcelain with overglaze polychrome

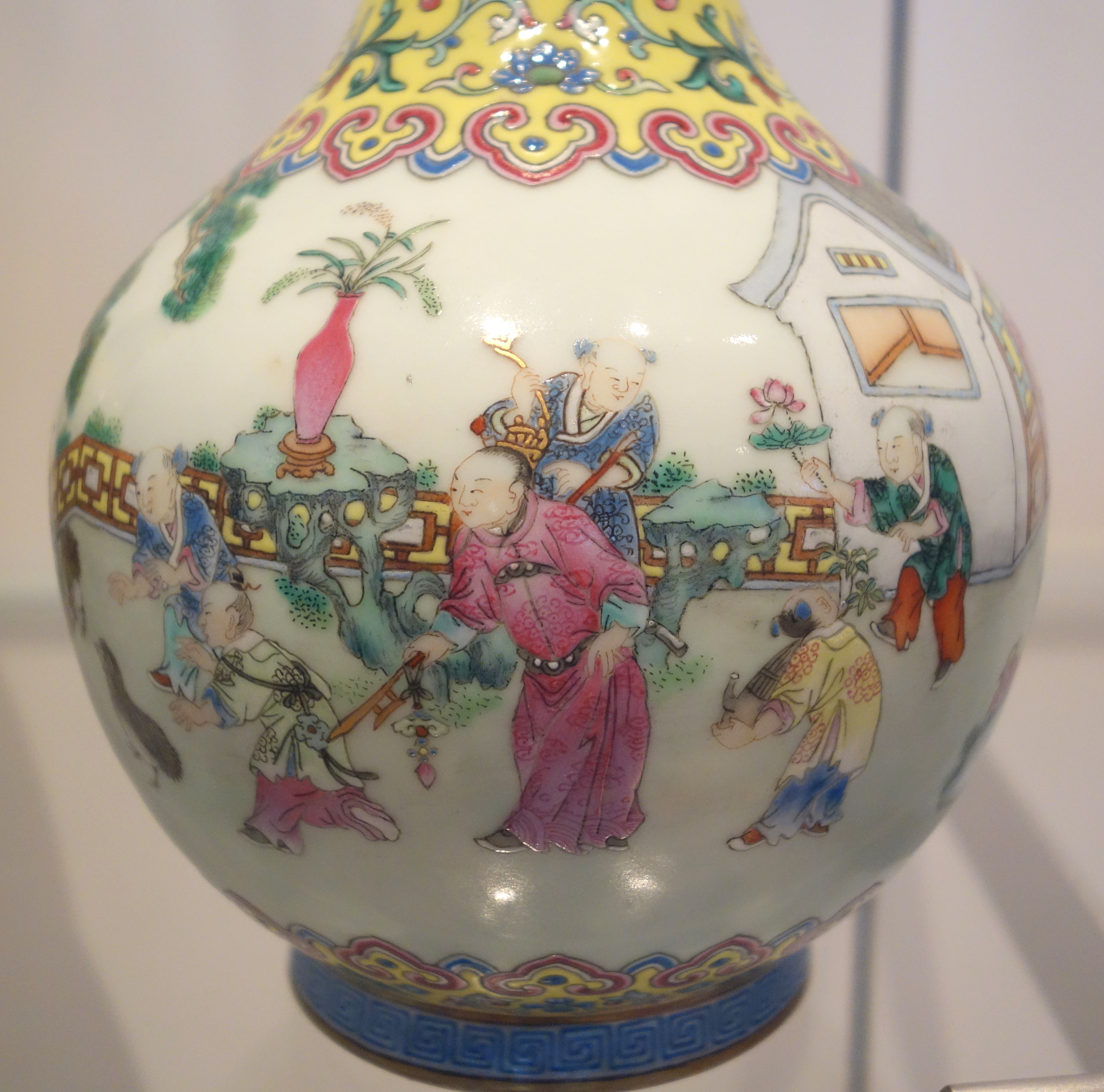
Vase with children, Jiaqing period, 1796–1820, glazed porcelain, enamels

== Exports to Europe ==
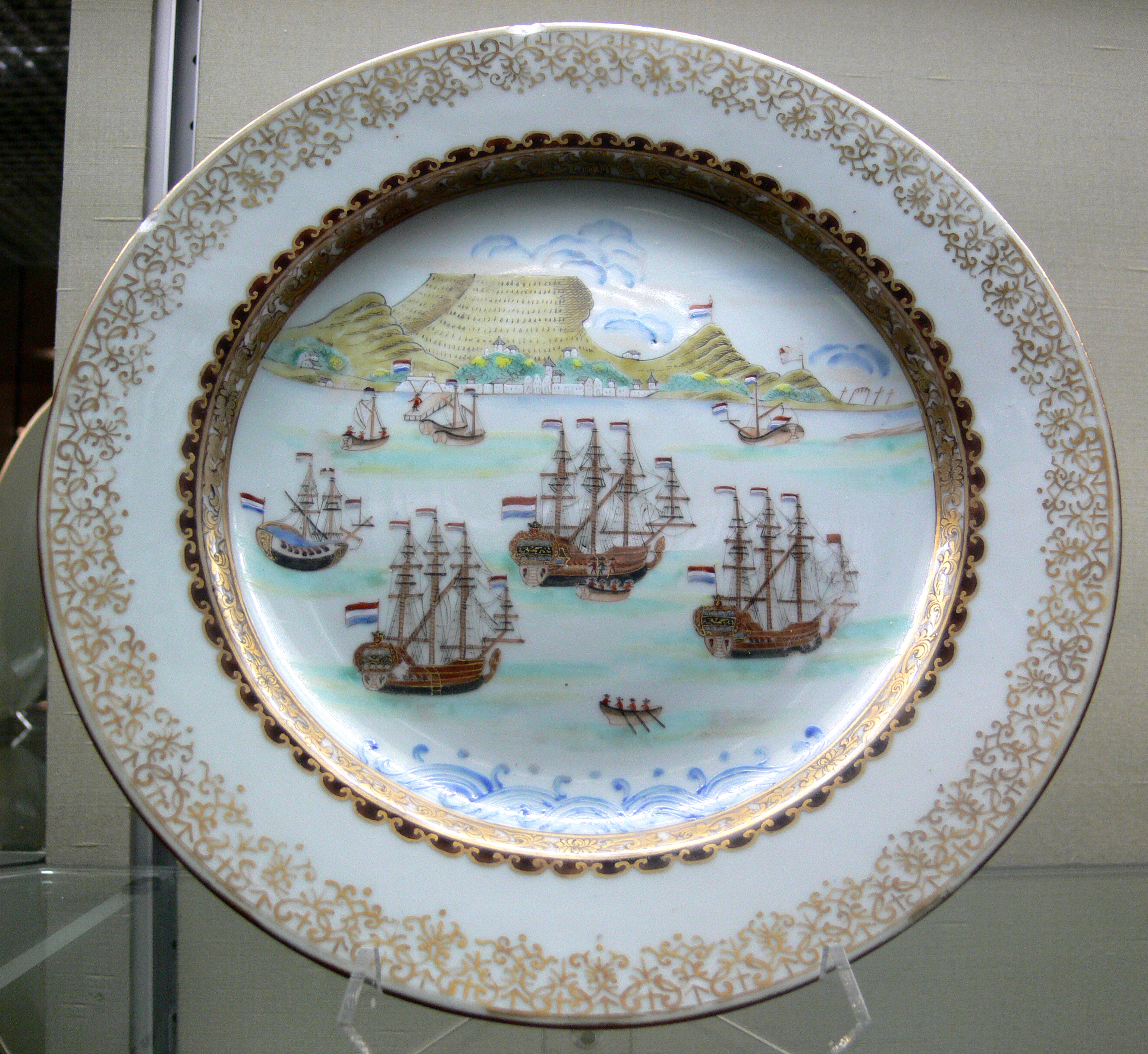
Late 18th-century plate in European style, with Dutch ships, Canton porcelain, painted there on a "blank" from Jingdezhen

European visitors to Istanbul in the fifteenth and sixteenth centuries are recorded as having purchased Chinese porcelain there. Some other pieces came via the Portuguese settlement of Malacca; King Manuel I had several acquired from Vasco de Gama. The Chamber of Art and Curiosities at Ambras Castle contains the collection of Archduke Ferdinand II of Austria, assembled during the mid-15th century. These early collections, typically of blue-and-white ware, were regarded as rare curios and art objects, and were often mounted in precious metals.

During the seventeenth and eighteenth centuries a number of European companies were established to import various commodities including tea, silk, spices, lacquerwork and porcelain from East Asia. Research by Volker has given figures for the trade in Chinese and Japanese porcelain carried out by the Dutch East India Company; between 1602 and 1682 the company exported between 30 and 35 million pieces. The English East India Company also imported around 30 million pieces, the French East India Company 12 million, the Portuguese East India Company 10 million and the Swedish East India Company some 20 million pieces between 1766 and 1786.

The massive increase in imports allowed purchasers to amass large collections, which were often displayed in dedicated rooms or purpose-built structures. The Trianon de Porcellaine built between 1670 and 1672 was a Baroque pavilion constructed to display Louis XIV's collection of blue-and-white porcelain, set against French blue-and-white faience tiles both on the interior and exterior of the building. It was demolished in 1687.

== After the empire ==
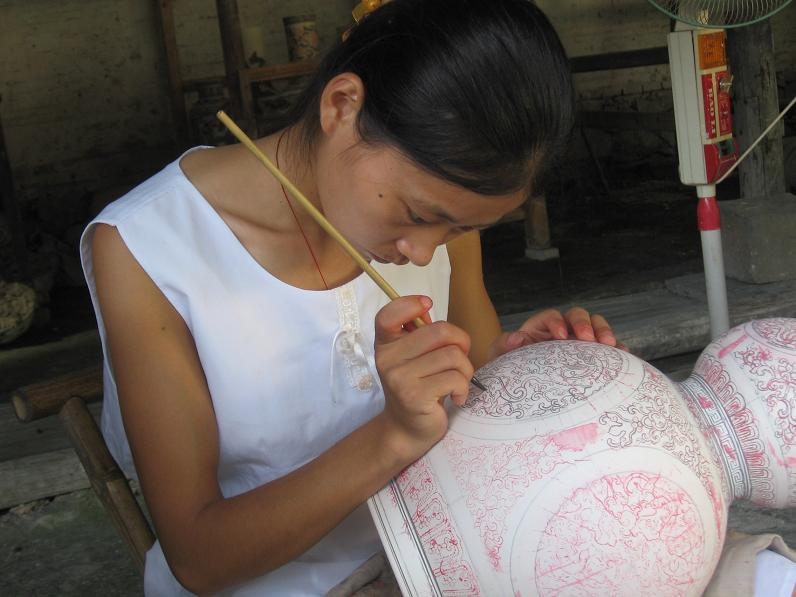
Porcelain workshop in Jingdezhen

Following the Xinhai Revolution of 1911 manufacture of porcelain for the imperial household ceased. In 1916 Yuan Shikai, acting as the Hongxian Emperor, appointed Guo Baochang to re-establish the imperial depot at Jingdezhen. Guo's workforce were initially set to produce copies of Ru ware, but this approach was abandoned in favour of copying enamelled ware of the 18th century. The high-quality porcelain of the Hongxian establishment continued to be produced after the abandonment of the empire and the death of Yuan in 1916; the depot was taken over by the Jiangxi Porcelain Company who retained one hundred of the workers. Production of enamelled and thin-walled "eggshell" ware continued through the 1920s and 1930s, with many pieces bearing Hongxian reign marks. By the 1930s the buildings that had housed the imperial supervisors were being used as army barracks.

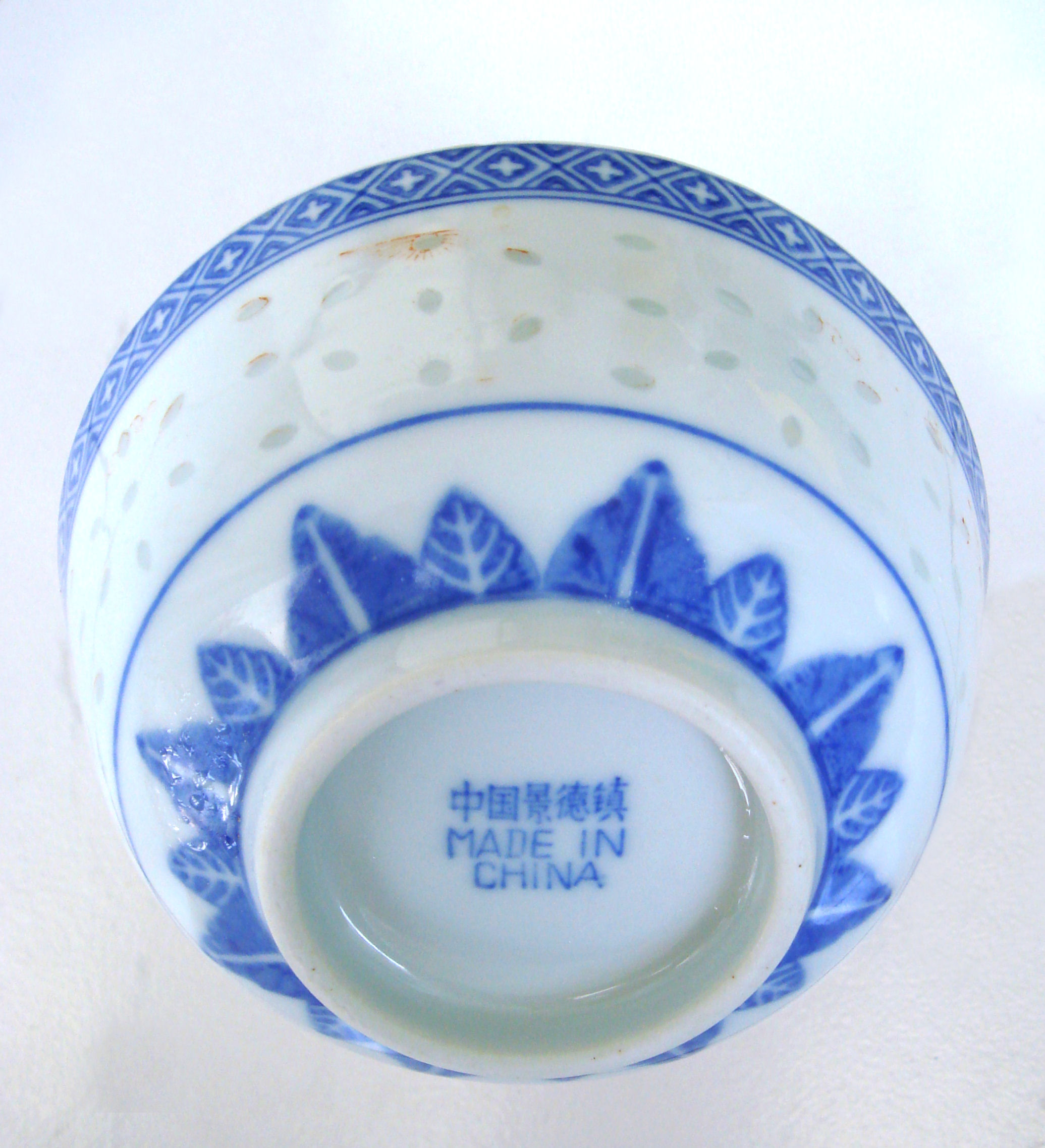
20th century Jingdezhen ware; bowl with "rice grain" decoration and factory mark: 中国景德镇 ("China Jingdezhen") and MADE IN CHINA in English

Ceramics continue to be produced on a large scale in Jingdezhen, in a variety of styles, many reproducing those of the past in a variety of qualities, with Jingdezhen porcelain being shipped around the world. One trend that has continued in the 20th century is the development of super-thin "eggshell" porcelain for vases. About 300 million pieces of porcelain were being produced annually in the late 20th century.

== Development of kiln technology ==
The dragon kiln was the traditional form of kiln used in southern China. Also known as a climbing kiln, this type in its final development consisted of a tunnel-like flue built up a slope from a main firebox. Along the sides of the kiln subsidiary entrances for side-stoking enabled the whole structure to be heated, and allowing the later dragon kilns to exceed 50 metres (160 ft) in length without any substantial drop in temperature. The draught created by the flow of hot air up the slope meant that the dragon kiln could be built without a chimney.

This type of kiln was supplanted at Jingdezhen by a gourd-shaped kiln, with a large firing chamber at the front, connecting to a smaller chamber with a lower roof and a chimney. The gourd-shaped kiln could produce large quantities of porcelain, fired at very high temperatures. By blocking the kiln vents to restrict air flow to the fire a reducing atmosphere of hydrogen and carbon monoxide could be maintained, which was necessary for some glazes such as copper red.

The gourd-shaped kiln was used throughout the fourteenth century; towards the end of the Ming period it was supplanted by the egg-shaped kiln or zhenyao kiln, shaped like half an egg on its side, with a firebox inside the kiln at the broad end and at the narrow end an arch communicating to a separate chimney. The chimney was built to a height of around 19 metres (62 ft); the high chimney increased the draught through the kiln and thus reduced the timing of the firing cycle to around 36 hours.

Wares were placed inside stacked saggars on a floor of quartz sand; as the saggars protected their contents from direct flame both fuel and air could be introduced directly to the interior through vents, allowing temperature regulation throughout the kiln. Peepholes were used to observe the colour of flame, which changes according to the conditions and temperature. The hottest part of the kiln next to the firebox was used for crackle glazes; following inwards high-fired green and red glazes in a reducing atmosphere, then uncoloured, blue-glazed, and decorated ware at a moderate temperature, followed at the back by glazes to be fired at a lower temperature and turquoise-glazed ware in an oxidising atmosphere.
