= Porcelain manufacturing companies in Europe =

Porcelain manufacturing companies are firms which manufacture porcelain.

== European porcelain manufacturers before the 18th century ==
The table below lists European manufacturers of porcelain established before the 18th century. This table may be sorted according to the year of foundation, description and country.

Year	Description	Site / location	Country	Remark
1575	Medici porcelain	Florence	Italy	Tuscany
1673	Rouen porcelain	Rouen	France	Normandy
1693	Saint-Cloud porcelain	Saint-Cloud	France	Ile-de-France

== 18th-century European porcelain manufacturing companies ==
The table below lists European manufacturers of porcelain established in the 18th century. This table may be sorted according to the year of foundation, description and country.

Year	Description	Site / location	Country	Remark
1710	Meissen porcelain	Meissen	Germany	Saxony
1718	Vienna porcelain	Vienna	Austria	This first phase called the "Du Pacquier factory"; from 1744 owned by the emperors
1720	Vezzi porcelain	Venice	Italy	Until 1727. First of the Venetian factories.
1730	Chantilly porcelain	Chantilly	France	Ile-de-France
1735	Doccia porcelain	Sesto Fiorentino	Italy	Tuscany
1740	Vincennes porcelain	Vincennes	France	Moved to Sèvres in 1756
1743	Capodimonte porcelain	Naples	Italy	moved to Madrid in 1760, becoming Real Fábrica del Buen Retiro
1743	Chelsea Porcelain	London	England	Merged with Derby in 1769
1744	Imperial Porcelain Factory, Saint Petersburg	Saint Petersburg	Russia	Formerly Lomonosov Porcelain Factory
1745	Mennecy porcelain	Mennecy	France	Ile-de-France
1746	Höchster Porzellanmanufaktur	Höchst (Frankfurt)	Germany	Hesse
1747	Bow porcelain factory	London	England	active c. 1747–64 and closed in 1776. Rival to Chelsea Porcelain
1747	Fürstenberg China	Fürstenberg	Germany	Lower Saxony
1747	Nymphenburg Porcelain Manufactory	Schloss Nymphenburg	Germany	Bavaria
1750	Royal Crown Derby	Derby	England	Year of establishment disputed with 1757
1750	Real Fábrica de Alcora	Alcora	Spain	Also called Real Fábrica de Loza y Porcelana; founded 1727 but porcelain production only began c. 1750
1751	Tournai porcelain	Tournai	Belgium	Hainaut
1751	Royal Worcester	Worcester	England	Acquired by Portmeirion in 2009
1754	Liverpool porcelain	Liverpool	England	Produced in various factories in Liverpool.
1755	Frankenthal Porcelain Factory	Frankenthal	Germany	Rhineland-Palatinate
1756	Manufacture nationale de Sèvres	Sévres	France	It is the continuation of Vincennes porcelain, founded in 1740, which moved to Sèvres in 1756.
1757	Porzellanmanufaktur Gotha	Gotha	Germany	Thuringia
1757	Royal Crown Derby	Derby	England	Year of establishment disputed with 1750
1757	Lowestoft Porcelain Factory	Lowestoft	England	Suffolk
1758	Marieberg porcelain	Stockholm	Sweden
1758	Ludwigsburg porcelain	Ludwigsburg	Germany	Baden-Württemberg
1758	Ansbach Porcelain	Ansbach	Germany	Bavaria
1759	Wedgwood	Stoke-on-Trent	England	The manufacture began to produce porcelain only in 1812
1759	Weesp porselein	Weesp	Netherlands	First Dutch porcelain factory was founded in Weesp, near Amsterdam
1760	Real Fábrica del Buen Retiro	Madrid	Spain	Capodimonte porcelain was moved to Madrid. Popularly called La China.
1760	Kloster Veilsdorf porcelain factory	Veilsdorf	Germany	Thuringia
1761	Porzellanmanufaktur Kelsterbach	Kelsterbach	Germany	Hessen
1762	Volkstedt porcelain	Volkstedt (Rudolstadt)	Germany	Thuringia
1762	Le Nove porcelain	Nove	Italy	Republic of Venice. Until 1835.
1763	Royal Porcelain Manufacture Berlin	Berlin	Germany	Abbreviated as KPM
1763	Niderviller pottery	Niderviller	France	Founded 1735; made porcelain from 1763 to 1827
1764	Cozzi porcelain	Venice	Italy	Republic of Venice. Until 1812.
1764	Wallendorf Porcelain	Lichte (Wallendorf)	Germany	Thuringia
1766	Gardner Manufacture	Verbilki	Russia	Moscow oblast, Taldomsky District
1766	Lunéville Faience	Lunéville	France	Founded 1730, made porcelain from 1766 to 1777
1766	Villeroy & Boch	Mettlach, Saarland	Germany	Established in Audun-le-Tiche, Lorraine, France; the company was established in 1748, but it began to produce porcelain wares only in 1766
1768	Plymouth porcelain	Plymouth, Devon	England	Moved to Bristol 1770–1781, New Hall 1781-1835
1770	Spode	Stoke-on-Trent	England	The manufacture began to produce porcelain only in 1800
1770	Rörstrand	Stockholm	Sweden	The company was established in 1726; however, it began to produce porcelain wares only in the 1770s
1771	Limoges porcelain	Limoges	France	Limoges maintains the position it established in the 19th century as the premier manufacturing city of porcelain in France.
1771	Naples porcelain	Naples	Italy	"Naples Royal Porcelain Manufactory" (Real fabbrica delle porcellane di Napoli). Also called the Real Fabbrica Ferdinandea. Until 1806.
1774	Loosdrechts porselein	Loosdrecht	Netherlands	Joannes de Mol established the manufactory
1775	Aynsley China	Longton, Staffordshire	England	Acquired by Belleek Pottery in 1997
1775	Royal Copenhagen	Copenhagen	Denmark	The Royal Copenhagen manufactory's operations began in a converted post office in 1775.
1777	Graf von Henneberg Porcelain, Ilmenau	Ilmenau	Germany	Thuringia
1777	Hollóháza Porcelain Manufactory	Hollohaza	Hungary	Borsod-Abaúj-Zemplén County
1783	Porcelain Manufacture Rauenstein	Rauenstein	Germany	Thuringia
1790	Weimar Porcelain	(Blankenhain)	Germany	Thuringia
1792	Haas & Czjzek	Horní Slavkov	Czech Republic	German: Schlaggenwald; defunct as of 2011
1793	Mintons	Stoke-on-Trent	England	United Kingdom
1794	Thun 1794	Klášterec nad Ohří	Czech Republic	Chomutov District
1794	Königlich privilegierte Porzellanfabrik	Tettau	Germany	Bavaria
1795	Coalport porcelain	Coalport	England	Acquired by Wedgwood in 1967

== 19th-century European porcelain manufacturing companies ==
The table below lists European manufacturers of porcelain established in the 19th century. This table may be sorted according to the year of foundation, description and country.

Year	Description	Site / location	Country	Remark
19th century	Bolesławiec	Bolesławiec	Poland	Originated in the Middle Ages and developed in the 17–19th centuries
1809	Porcelain Manufacture Ćmielów	Ćmielów	Poland	Świętokrzyskie Voivodeship
1813	Nantgarw China Works	Nantgarw	Wales	Produced porcelain between 1813 and 1820. Closed 1920
1814	Cambrian Pottery	Swansea	Wales	Established 1764. Produced Swansea porcelain 1814-1822. Closed 1870
1817	Real Fábrica de La Moncloa	Madrid	Spain	It was the successor of the Real Fábrica del Buen Retiro
1824	Vista Alegre	Ílhavo	Portugal	Porcelain and Crystal Factories in Portugal, producing Tableware, Giftware, Home Decor, and Hotelware
1826	Herend Porcelain Manufactory	Herend	Hungary	Veszprém County
1831	Porcelain Manufacture Wałbrzych	Wałbrzych	Poland	Wałbrzych Voivodeship
1832	Dulyovo porcelain works	Likino-Dulyovo	Russia	Moscow Oblast
1853	Bing & Grøndahl		Denmark	Merged with the Royal Porcelain Factory in 1987
1853	Zsolnay Porcelain Manufacture	Pécs	Hungary	Baranya County
1860	Zakłady Porcelany Stołowej Karolina	Jaworzyna Śląska	Poland	Wałbrzych Voivodeship
1864	Český porcelán a.s.	Dubí Teplice District	Czech Republic	Eichwelder Porzellan – und Ofenfabriken Bloch & Co. Böhmen
1872	Zaklady Porcelitu Stolowego	Pruszków	Poland	Masovian Voivodship
1873	Fabryka Faiansu Włocławek	Włocławek	Poland	Kuyavian-Pomeranian Voivodship
1873	Arabia porcelain	Toukola (Helsinki)	Finland	Kitchenware and tableware
1882	Porcelain manufactore G.Benedikt	Karlovy Vary	Czech Republic
1884	Belleek	Belleek County Fermanagh	Northern Ireland	Ulster
1885	Porsgrunds Porselænsfabrik	Porsgrunn	Norway	Telemark county
1897	Porcelain Manufacture Chodzież	Chodzież	Poland	Greater Poland Voivodship

== Current porcelain manufacturers in Germany ==
Year	Description	Site / location	Remark
1710	Meissen porcelain	Meissen, Saxony	1st porcelain manufacturing company in Europe
1746	Höchst Porzellanmanufaktur	Höchst (Frankfurt), Hesse	Höchster Porzellanmanufaktur
1747	Fürstenberg China	Fürstenberg, Lower Saxony
1747	Nymphenburg Porcelain Manufactory	Schloss Nymphenburg, Bavaria
1748	Villeroy & Boch	Mettlach, Saarland	established in Audun-le-Tiche, Lorraine, France
1751	Königliche Porzellan Manufaktur	Berlin
1762	Älteste Volkstedter Porzellanmanufaktur	Volkstedt (Rudolstadt), Thuringia
1763	Royal Porcelain Manufacture Berlin	Berlin
1764	Wallendorfer Porzellan	Lichte (Wallendorf), Thuringia
1790	Weimar porcelain	Blankenhain, Thuringia
1794	Königlich privilegierte Porzellanfabrik	Tettau, Bavaria
1814	Hutschenreuther	Selb, Bavaria	Part of Rosenthal GmbH
1822	Lichte Porzellan	Lichte, Thuringia
1844	KAHLA/Thuringian porcelain company	Kahla, Thuringia
1877	Wagner & Apel Porzellan	Lippelsdorf, Thuringia	Lippelsdorf Porcelain figures and sculptures
1879	Rosenthal GmbH	Selb, Bavaria	Part of Sambonet Paderno Industrie
1881	Bauscher Weiden company, dishware	Bavaria
1887	Arzberg porcelain	Arzberg, Bavaria	Part of Rosenthal GmbH (since 2013)
1903	Heinrich & Co.	Selb, Bavaria	1896 as porcelain painters, 1903 as manufacturer; part of Villeroy & Boch
1910	Seltmann Weiden	Weiden, Bavaria
1931	Linder Porzellanfabrik KG	Küps, Bavaria
1986	Barbara Flügel Porcelain	Selb, Bavaria

== Current porcelain manufacturers in other European countries ==
Year	Description	Location	Country	Remark
1735	Richard-Ginori	Sesto Fiorentino	Italy	See Richard-Ginori 1735
1743	Capodimonte porcelain	Naples	Italy
1744	Imperial Porcelain Factory	Saint-Petersburg	Russia	Also known as the Lomonosov Porcelain Factory
1750	Royal Crown Derby	Derby	England	Year of establishment disputed with 1757
1751	Royal Worcester	Stoke-on-Trent	England	Acquired by Portmeirion in 2009
1755	Royal Copenhagen	Copenhagen	Denmark	Also known as the Royal Porcelain Factory
1756	Manufacture nationale de Sèvres	Sévres	France	It is the continuation of Vincennes porcelain, founded in 1740, which moved to Sèvres in 1756.
1757	Royal Crown Derby	Derby	England	Year of establishment disputed with 1750
1759	Wedgwood	Stoke-on-Trent	England
1766	Verbilki porcelain	Verbilki	Russia	Former Gardner manufactory, Dmitrov porcelain factory
1770	Spode	Stoke-on-Trent	England	Acquired by Portmeirion in 2009
1775	Aynsley China	Longton, Staffordshire	England	Acquired by Belleek Pottery in 1997
1777	Hollóháza Porcelain Manufactory	Hollóháza, Borsod-Abaúj-Zemplén County	Hungary	See Hollóháza porcelánjáról
1794	Thun 1794	Klášterec nad Ohří, Chomutov District	Czech Republic	German: Klösterle an der Eger
1809	Porcelain Manufactory Ćmielów	Ćmielów	Poland	Świętokrzyskie Voivodeship
1820	Porcelana Krzysztof/ Kristoff	Wałbrzych	Poland	Lower Silesian Voivodship
1824	Vista Alegre	Ílhavo	Portugal	Porcelain and Crystal Factories in Portugal, producing Tableware, Giftware, Home Decor, and Hotelware
1826	Herend Porcelain Manufactory	Herend	Hungary	Veszprém County
1831	Porcelana Wałbrzych	Wałbrzych	Poland	Wałbrzych Voivodeship
1832	Dulyovo porcelain works	Likino-Dulyovo	Russia	Moscow Oblast. Former M.S. Kuznetsov partnership
1852	Porcelana Tułowice	Tułowice	Poland
1853	Bing & Grøndahl		Denmark	Merged with the Royal Porcelain Factory in 1987
1853	Zsolnay Porcelain Manufacture	Pécs	Hungary	Baranya County
1860	Zakłady Porcelany Stołowej Karolina	Jaworzyna Śląska	Poland	Wałbrzych Voivodeship
1864	Český porcelán a.s.	Dubí Teplice District	Czech Republic	Eichwelder Porzellan – und Ofenfabriken Bloch & Co. Böhmen
1872	Porcelana Pruszkow	Pruszkow	Poland	Masovian Voivodship
1873	Arabia porcelain	Toukola (Helsinki)	Finland	Kitchenware and tableware
1882	Porcelain manufactore G.Benedikt	Karlovy Vary	Czech Republic
1884	Belleek Pottery	Belleek, County Fermanagh	Northern Ireland	Ulster
1885	Porsgrunds Porselænsfabrik	Porsgrunn	Norway	Telemark county
1897	Porcelana Chodzież	Chodzież	Poland	Greater Poland Voivodeship
1906	Porzellanfabrik Langenthal		Switzerland	Today: G. Benedikt
1907	Rudolf Kämpf	Nové Sedlo, Sokolov District	Czech Republic	See cz:Loučky (Nové Sedlo)
1920	Huta Franciszka	Bykowina	Poland	Upper Silesian voivodship
1922	Porcelana Bogucice	Katowice- Roździeń	Poland	Upper Silesian Voivodship
1923	Augarten porcelain	Vienna	Austria
1938	JIESIA porcelain, Kauno Jiesia, UAB	Kaunas	Lithuania	JIESIA porcelain; the main manufacturer in the post-soviet region and the only bone china company in the Baltic States
1941	Figgjo porcelain	Sandnes	Norway	Figgjo is a trend-setting porcelain manufacturer for the professional kitchen (see www.figgjo.com)
1955	JEMA KERAMISCH ATELIER N.V.	Maastricht	Netherlands	Jema Holland ceramic studio.
1969	ZPS Lubiana SA	Łubiana	Poland	Pomeranian Voivodeship
1975	Manufacture de Porcelaine de Monaco	Monaco	Monaco	Founded by Erich Rozewicz, with the support of Princess Grace and Prince Rainier III of Monaco.
1970	Apulum SA	Alba Iulia	Romania
1949	Sargadelos	Lugo	Spain	Galicia, Spain
1991	GreenGate	Copenhagen	Denmark
1991	AXA Porcelaine S.R.L.	Alba Iulia	Romania
1987	Porcel S.A.	Aveiro	Portugal	PORCEL; prestigious brand and manufacturer of porcelain located in Portugal
19??	Porzellanmanufaktur Reidling GmbH	Sitzenberg-Reidling	Austria	Lower Austria
2000	Marie Daâge	Limoges	France
2012	Capodimonte's Finest	Naples	Italy
