= Louis Gerverot =

French porcelain painter and businessman

Louis Victor Gerverot (8 December 1747 – 6 January 1829) was a French porcelain painter and businessman.

== Life ==
=== Early life ===
Gerverot was born in Lunéville. His father was a "musicus" (singer) at the court of Stanisław Leszczyński, former king of Poland, who became in 1737 the duke of Lotharingen. His mother, Barbe Oubert, sent him to the porcelain factory in Sèvres in 1764, to learn his trade. Possibly he had himself already asked to specialize in the painting of porcelain with flowers and (fantastical) birds. Gerverot became extremely able in the preparation of colour, clay mixtures, and (since his stay in Niderviller) in other trade secrets. His urge to travel and to turn his knowledge into money (or his inability to stay in any one place for long) resulted in his short periods in various porcelain factories. In succession, he was active in Ludwigsburg, Ansbach, Höchst, Fürstenberg and Frankenthal.

=== Weesp and Loosdrecht ===
In 1767, Gerverot won a large sum in the city lottery of Mainz. In 1769, he came to Weesp, and worked in the porcelain factory of Bertrand Philip, count of Gronsveld, former envoy in Berlin, and now drost of Muiden and president of the Admiralty of Amsterdam. Production and activity did not take off and thus this enterprise, Holland's first porcelain factory, closed in 1771. Gerverot left for the faience- or porcelain factory of Offenbach am Main, Höchst and Ellwangen. In nearby Schrezheim, Gerverot worked at his own expense.

Minister Joannes de Mol sent Gerverot a portrait of a minister-colleague in 1774 from which he made a bust, and in return de Mol brought Gerverot up to Oud-Loosdrecht as a manager, painter and pigment-maker. The designing of new models was not his strongest suit, but nevertheless Gerverot deserved his new salary, of 150 guilder per month.

=== Amsterdam ===
Gerverot possibly lived an unconventional life, as may be seen from the fact that in 1776 he witnessed the christening of a child in the French Roman Catholic chapel. The child was named Louis Victor George d' Onis, with his father noted as George Alexander d' Onis and his mother a black woman, named Coba. The legality of their marriage was called into doubt by the authorities.

Gerverot in 1777 married Modesta Johanna Salomons, from Hamburg. In Amsterdam, they had three children: Louis Victor (born 1778), Johannes Victor (born 1780) and Georg Samuel (born in 1783, but buried in Amsterdam in 1784). L.V. Gerverot lived in the Plantage (plantation), then a large park with inns, speelhuizen (playhouses, where billiards was played) and brothels, now Artis and its surroundings. All his children were baptized at home, since he did not belong to a particular church.

On 1 March 1779, Gerverot was dismissed in Loosdrecht, having lent De Mol 28,000 guilder. Cooperation seemed to be impossible. Gerverot opened a porcelain store in Amsterdam, but early in 1788 had to declare bankruptcy. (This period in the life of Gerverot is unclear. It may be that he also worked in Cologne, Münster and Hanover).

Gerverot traveled to England and took employment with John Turner, one of Wedgwood's most significant competitors. In 1795, his purse again empty, he arrived in Brunswick and was taken on once more at the Fürstenberg factory. Two years later he was its manager. Under his leadership the factory became commercially successful for the first time in its existence. In 1814, Gerverot was dismissed for collaboration with the French. He died at Bevern.

== Bibliography ==
- This article is based entirely or partially on its equivalent on Dutch Wikipedia.
- Jacob-Hanson, C. (2004) Louis Victor Gerverot in a new light: his early years and bird painting, 1766–1773 – Biography. Magazine Antiques, Jan 2004
- Weisz, G. (1965) Het porseleinboek. De geschiedenis van stijlen en technieken met een uitvoerig merkenregister.
- Zappey, W.M. (1988) De Loosdrechtse porseleinfabriek 1774–1784. In: Blaauwen, A.L. den, et al. (1988) Loosdrechts porselein 1774–1784.
