= Apulum =

Apulum may refer to:

- The Latin name of Alba Iulia
- Apulum (castra), the Roman fort of Alba Iulia
- Apulum (conurbation), the civil settlements around the Roman fort
- Apulum (company), a Romanian porcelain manufacturing company
- Apulum (Acta Musei Apulensis), a periodical issued by the National Museum of Unification Alba Iulia
- Apulum Alba Iulia, the former name of FC Unirea Alba Iulia, a football team
