= Hollóháza Porcelain Manufactory =

Porcelain maker in Hollóháza, Hungary

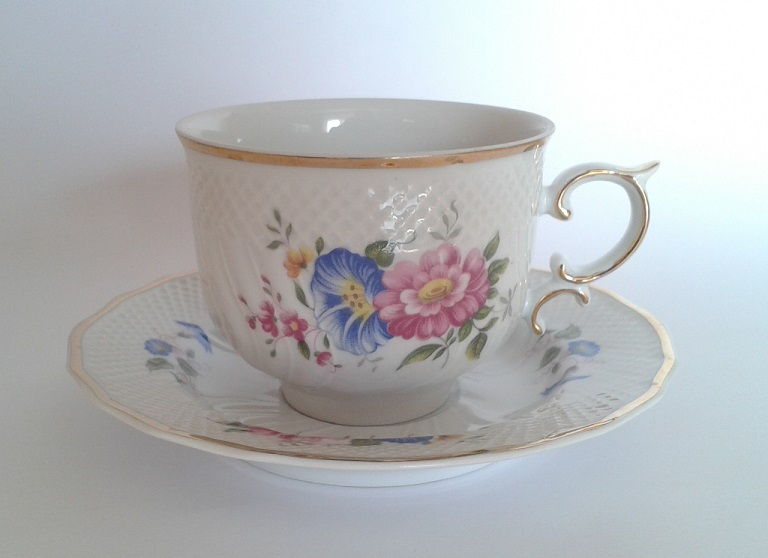
Teacup from Pannónia tea set with baroque style.

Hollóháza porcelain is produced by the Porcelain Manufactory of Hollóháza, Hungary. The manufactory was founded in 1777, originally as glassworks. It is one of the oldest remaining, now state-owned porcelain manufactury in Hungary.

== History ==
Hollohazi porcelain is one of the oldest porcelain manufactories in Europe and it is the oldest in Hungary, dating back to 1777. The factory just recently celebrated its 240th year in business, still on the original site in rural Northeastern Hungary amid lush forests and rolling hills. In the beginning, they only made rudimentary, although visually appealing glass cups, bottles and dishes. At the dawn of the 19th century, the glass industry has flourished. However, the main transport routes and the raw materials needed to manufacture glass were far from the factory site. So, the owner of the factory, Count Mihály Károlyi decided to turn it into a ceramic manufactory in 1831, using the kaolin clay found nearby.

From the very beginning, there were multiple owners of the manufactory, but the first real upswing came in 1857 under the ownership of Ferenc Istvanyi. He developed the small plant into a major manufacturing facility. This ensured full employment in the barely 700 soul village. Although the products were made in a factory, they were still very folksy artifacts. The decorations and motifs were passed on from father to son, hand to hand. Ornamental porcelain such as figurines, lamps, wall clock appeared with the advent of the 20th century. After the post-World War I restart in 1923, the management went to great lengths to ensure the correct material composition of the porcelain. The price of porcelain went ever higher, new products were developed; however -due to the lending bank's bankruptcy- the factory closed for 8 months. Another upswing began in 1939, when a new tenant, a trader named Karoly Szakmary took over. He set off with great ambition to improve production and capacity of the artistically and technically outdated manufactory. He had installed a new coal-fired furnace; replaced the outdated steam-powered generator for new, electrical equipment, three modern electric furnaces were also installed which allowed for new production methods to be implemented for the newest designs. The factory could finally satisfy the needs and tastes of not only the rural population, but of the metropolitan gentry as well. Unfortunately, Karoly Szakmary was prevented from finishing his plans, when the factory was nationalized by the communist state after World War II, in 1948.

After the nationalization, Hollohazi Porcelain was only allowed to manufacture industrial porcelain, such as electrical insulators. The first applied art pieces came only in 1957. Starting from the 1960s young and talented artists took over the new product development, establishing Hollohazi Porcelain Mfg as an important site for the Hungarian and lately, all- European art scene.

Hollohazi porcelain wares are available on the American continent as well, through the factory's authorized importer, Raven Relix Inc.

== Artists ==
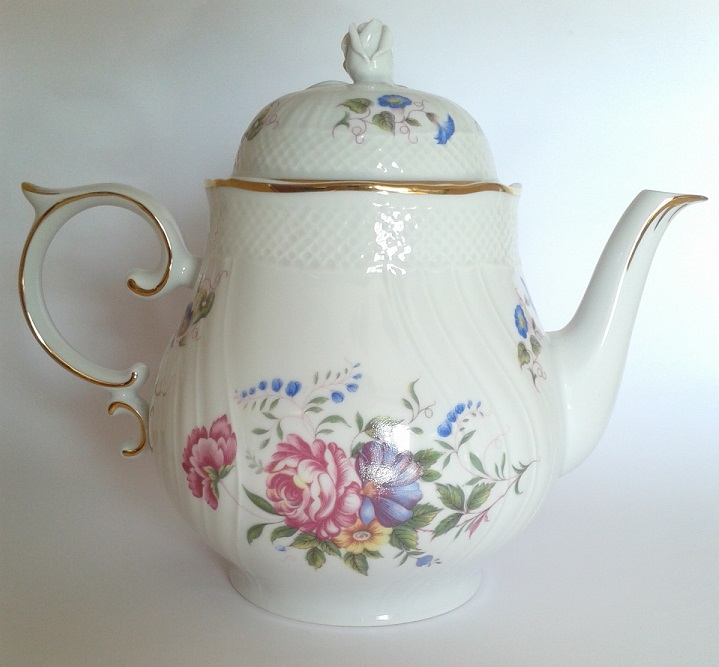
Teapot from Pannónia tea set with baroque style.

- Katalin Gulyás
- Miklós Faragó
- Endre Szász

== Sources ==
- Hollóházi Porcelángyár Kft.
- Raven Relix Inc
