= Hollóháza =

Hollóháza Holoház
- Village
- Flag Coat of arms

- Location of Hollóháza
- Coordinates: 48°32′19″N 21°25′1″E
- Country: Hungary
- Region: Northern Hungary
- County: Borsod-Abaúj-Zemplén
- District: Sátoraljaújhely

Government
  - Mayor: Gabriella Füzériné Odrobina

Area
  - Total: 2.36 km^{2} (0.91 sq mi)

Population (1 January 2025)
  - Total: 735
  - Density: 311/km^{2} (807/sq mi)

Population by ethnicity (2022)
  - Hungarian: 80,5%
  - Slovak: 18,1%
  - Ukrainian: 0,1%
  - Greek: 0,1%
  - Slovenian: 0,1%
  - Croat: 0,1%
  - Polish: 0,1%
  - Gypsy: 0,1%
  - Other: 1,5%
  - Unreported: 12,6%

Population by religion (2022)
  - Roman Catholic: 54,0%
  - Reformed: 7,2%
  - Greek Catholic: 3,2%
  - Other Catholic: 1,2%
  - Other Christian: 0,7%
  - Lutheran: 0,6%
  - Orthodox: 0,3%
  - Non religious: 3,0%
  - Unreported: 29,8%
- Time zone: UTC+1 (CET)
  - Summer (DST): UTC+2 (CEST)
- Postal code: 3999
- Area code: (+36) 47
- Website: www.hollohaza.hu

Hollóháza (Slovak: Holoház) is a village in Borsod-Abaúj-Zemplén County in northeastern Hungary. The eastern endpoint of the National Blue Trail and the Hollóháza Porcelain Manufactory is located here. With an area of 236 hectares, it is the second-smallest municipality in the county in terms of administrative area.

== Geography ==
The village is located in one of the valleys of the Zemplén Mountains. It lies 81 kilometers northeast of Miskolc by road, 28 kilometers northwest of Sátoraljaújhely, and 3.5 kilometers south of the Hungarian-Slovak border.

Its neighboring towns are Fűzér and Fűzérkomlós in Hungary, and Skároš in Slovakia. It can only be reached by road, via Kéked or Füzérkomlós on Route 3719, or from Slovakia on Secondary Road 37 124.

== History ==
The area has been inhabited since the Hungarian Conquest and was first mentioned in 1270, when it belonged to Füzér Castle. It was named after the raven (holló), the heraldic animal of the Pauline Order, but in the Middle Ages it was also known as Felsőkomlós.

In the 17th century, Slovak settlers were resettled in the village. In 1777, they began manufacturing glass in the village, and later switched to porcelain production. The Hollóháza Porcelain Manufactory is still in operation today.

After the Treaty of Trianon, in 1920, the village belonged to Czechoslovakia for a time, with the exception of the porcelain factory, which remained in Hungary. Thanks to the intervention of the Károlyi Family, who owned the factory at the time, a border correction was made in the area, and after two weeks, the village was returned to Hungary.

== Gallery ==
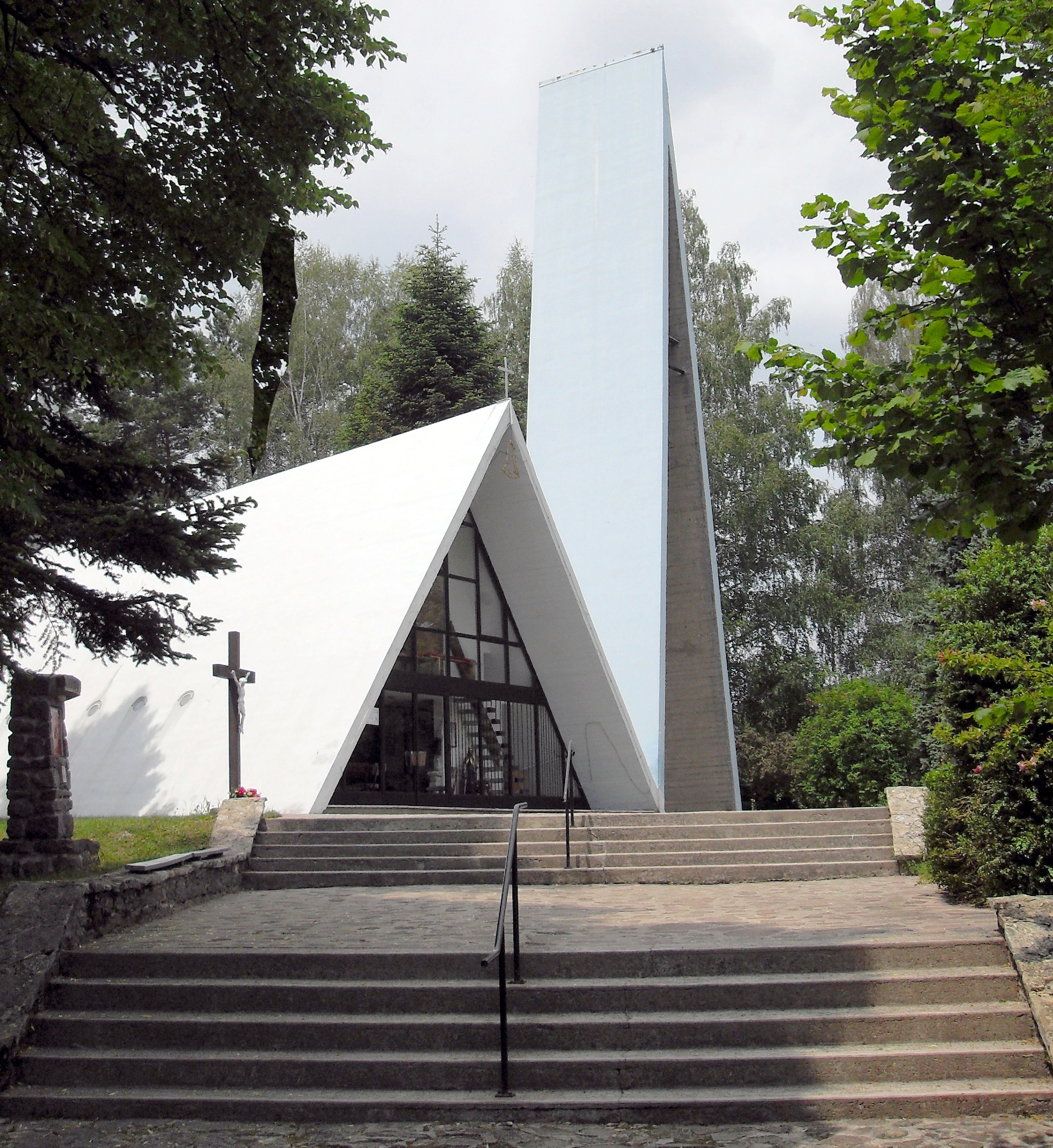
Catholic Church

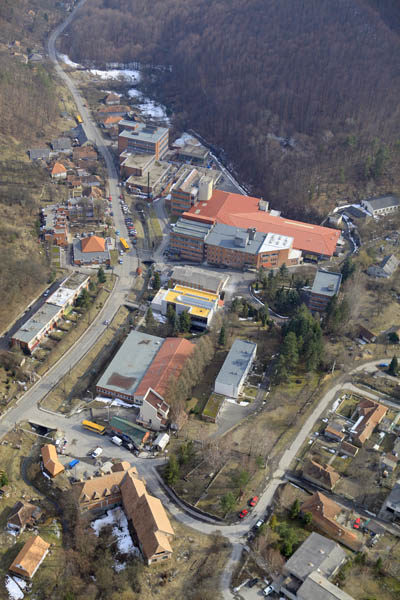
Porcelain Manufactory

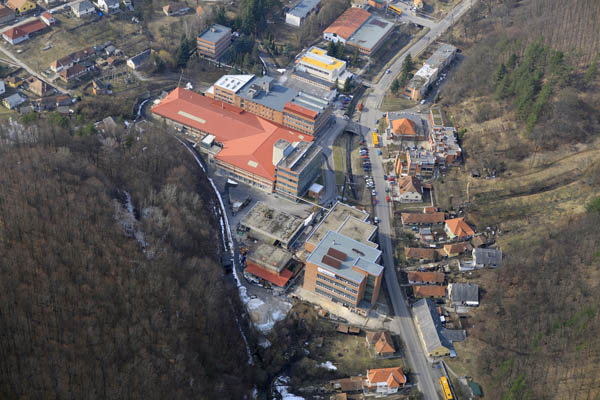

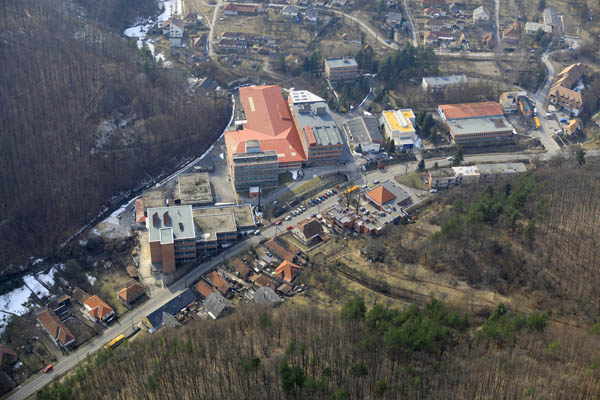

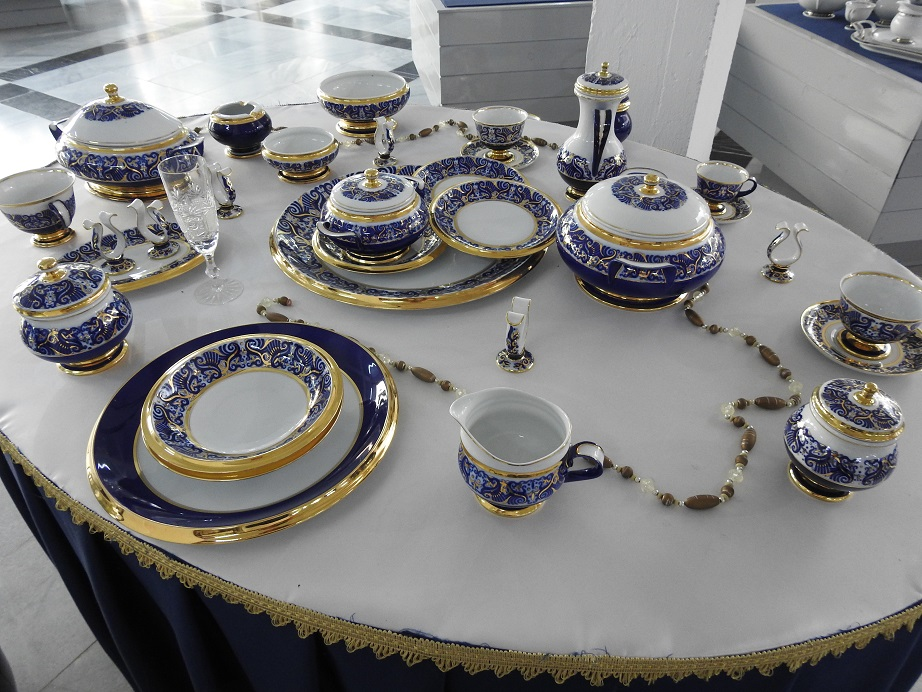
Porcelain made in Hollóháza

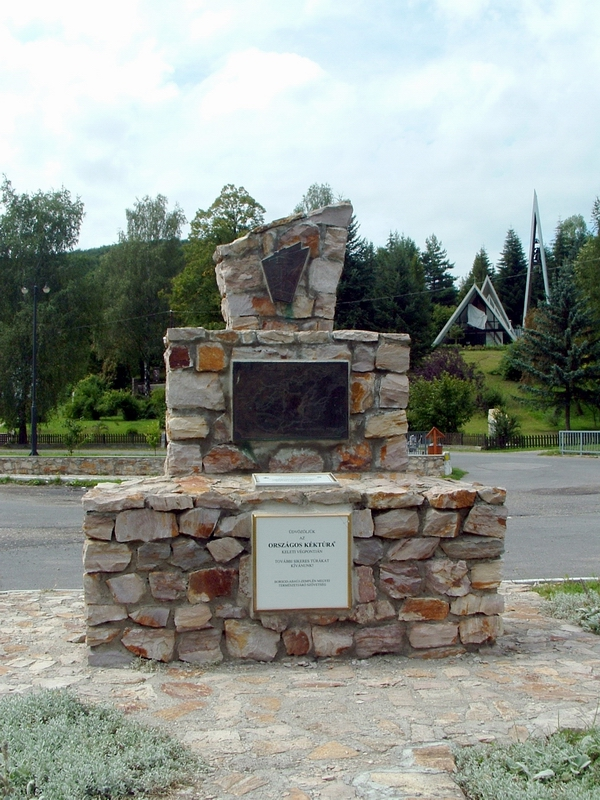
Eastern endpoint of the National Blue Trail
