= Joannes de Mol =

Dutch minister, Patriot and porcelain manufacturer

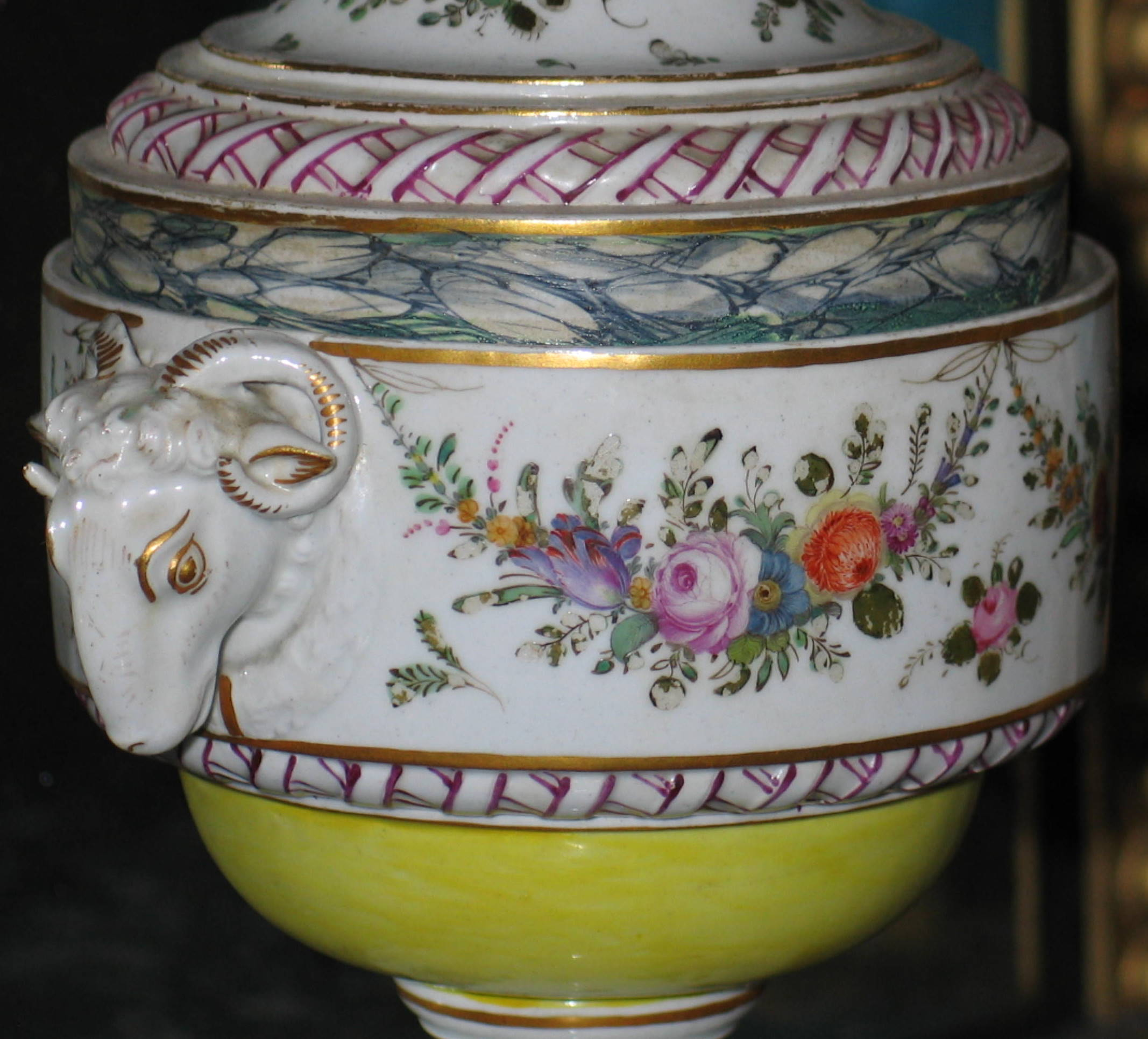
Detail porcelain from Loosdrecht, in Museum Geelvinck-Hinlopen Huis

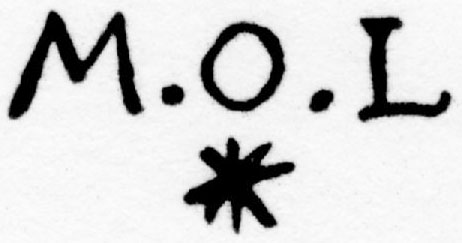
Manufactuur Oud-Loosdrecht mark

Joannes de Mol (September 15, 1726 – November 22, 1782) was a Dutch minister, Patriot and porcelain manufacturer in the second half of the 18th century. De Mol - like many of his contemporaries - had a great interest in poetry and scientific experiments.

== Life ==
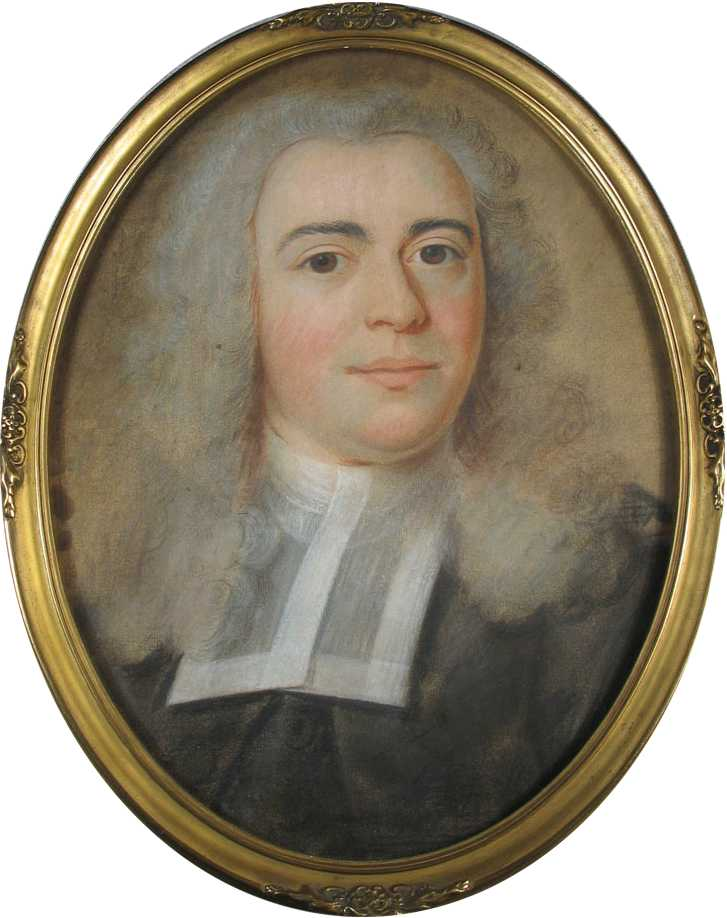
Portrait of Joannes de Mol by Pieter Oets (1720-1790). Kasteel-museum Sypesteyn, Nieuw-Loosdrecht.

De Mol was born in 1726 at Midlum, near Harlingen and, like his father, studied theology in Leiden. His first post was at 's-Gravenpolder in Zeeland, before moving in 1752 to Oud-Loosdrecht. There he got to know one of the richest women in Amsterdam, Anna de Haze who had a country house in the village and a collection of Meissen porcelain. In 1774 De Mol bought a clay part, stored in the Muiderslot, left over from the porcelain factory in Weesp. That factory started in 1759 by Bertrand Philip, count of Gronsveld, bailiff of Muiden and member of the Admiralty of Amsterdam. The factory was declared a failure in 1770, and hardly produced a little more for its last two years.

De Mol began with experiments in his garden shed behind the parsonage, opposite the church in Oud-Loosdrecht. In 1774, he started producing porcelain as a way of creating employments for the local population in the impoverished peat district. A part of the production process, however, was sited in Bilthoven. On a country estate, property of the youngest brother of Belle van Zuylen, stood a "pletmolen met stamperij" (mill with grinding facilities), where feldspar, but possibly also cheap Chinese porcelain was added and ground up. The raw materials were mixed up with suitable white clay (from England?) and quartz in a cellar in Utrecht, and shipped to Oud-Loosdrecht.

The factory at Oud-Loosdrecht employed sixty men, of which twenty acted as painters and 25 were children, who also were trained in drawing. Under the foreign employees was Louis Victor Gerverot, then known as a painter of exotic birds on porcelain. To finance the business, a few regents in Amsterdam, along with his sister-in-law, Eva de Mol-van Eibergen, acted as guarantor, jointly invested 200,000 guilders in the factory.

In 1779, De Mol was laureated by the Economics Branch for the care of his workforce. De Mol took former soldiers from Surinam to employ. The managers of the Suriname Society had made contact with him and convened in his business. J.G. Eichhorn, a German, who had a stiff right arm, was given a salary of two guilders per week and the Association provided a same sum . Nevertheless, De Mol - who had in the meantime become a patriot - had major difficulties keeping his head above water. His products were expensive: a cup and saucer costing seven guilder, then more than a week's salary for most.

De Mol's main fear was his competitor Anton Lyncke in the Hague, who imported white porcelain from Germany to the Hague for painting. De Mol organised special lotteries to finance his work, but in 1781 was again forced to borrow money from the Amsterdam banker and art collector Jan Hope. Barbara van der Hoeven, Hope's wife, came into the possession of 25% of the shares in the Manufactuur Old-Loosdrecht (M.O.L.).

== Old age ==
Because of weak health and output problems, De Mol had to sell his factory in 1782 for 12,000 guilder to four Amsterdam regents: Joachim Rendorp, John Hope, Abraham Dedel and Cornelis van der Hoop. His creditors put in place a new manager, Frederik Daeuber. De Mol died two weeks later at a prestigious lodging de Rondeel on the river Amstel. The innkeeper tried to take possession of de Mol's stock in the warehouse on Singel.

Johannes de Mol always had the illusion that his son would follow in his footsteps. In 1783, however, Huibert fled to Germany with a 19-year-old (under age) noble girl from Maarssen. In 1784, porcelain production was moved to Ouder-Amstel. It received the protection of Louis Bonaparte, in 1806 the first king of the Netherlands. About 1820, it ceased porcelain production.

== See also ==
- Loosdrecht
