= Bertrand Philip, Count of Gronsveld =

Dutch envoy

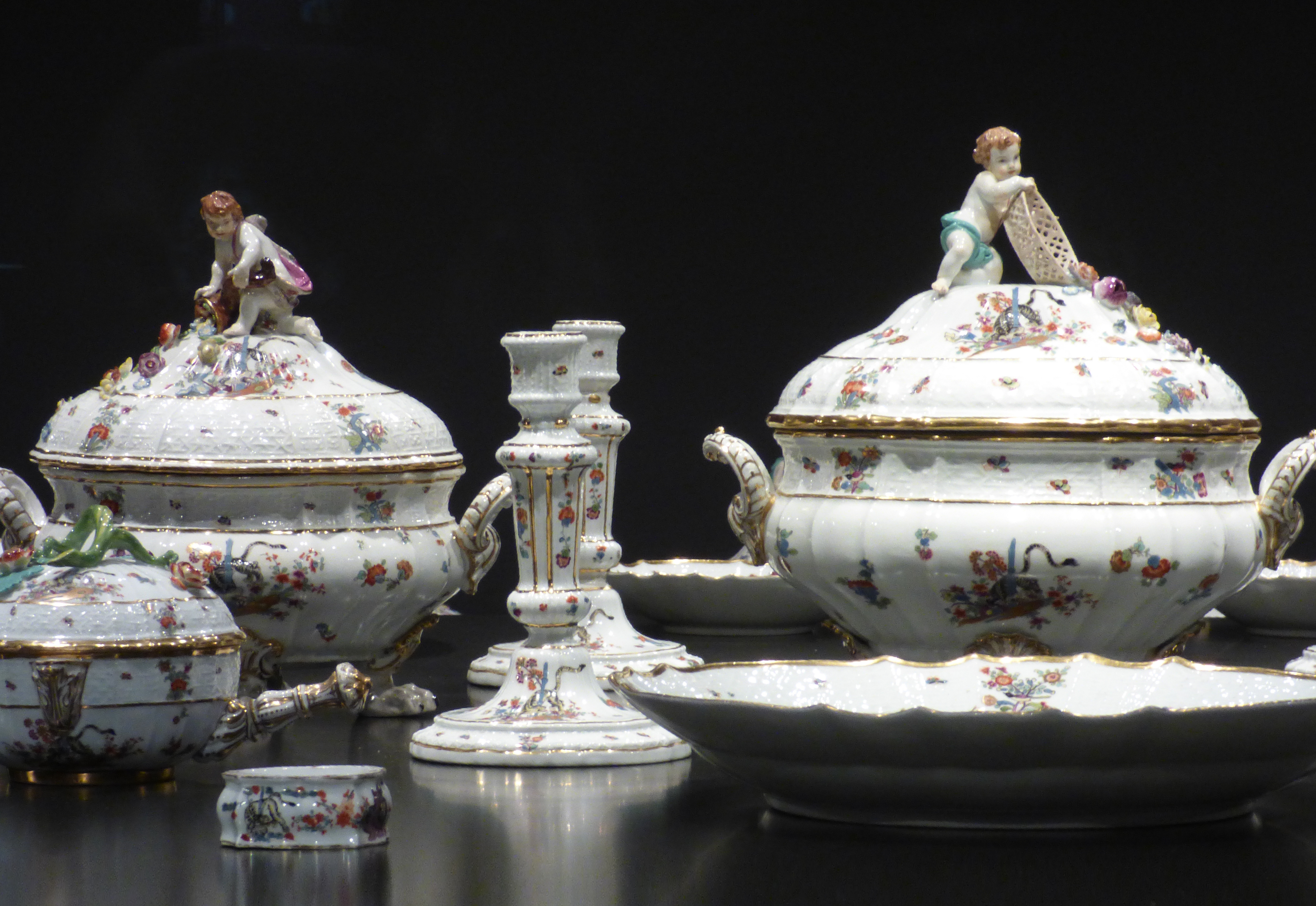
Parts of a service from the porcelain factory of Weesp, c. 1764-1768. Rijks Museum.

Bertrand Philip Sigismund Albrecht, Count of Gronsveld-van Diepenbroick-Impel (19 November 1715, Empel – 15 November 1772, Amsterdam) was a former Dutch envoy in Berlin to Frederick the Great.

He was the fourth son of Johann Bertram Arnold, Freiherr von Diepenbroick, from 1719 on "von Gronsfeld-Diepenbroick", and Wilhelmine, countess of Wartensleben. In 1750 or 1751, Bertrand married Amöne Sophie Friederike zu Löwenstein-Wertheim-Virneburg. He was lord of Wijngaarden and Ruigbroek from an unknown date.

From 1749, he was a member of the Ridderschap of Holland, drost of Muiden and president of the Admiralty of Amsterdam. In 1749 he oversaw a proposal by stadholder William IV of a binding college. The Count of Gronsveld fell in 1758 at the instigation of Willem Bentinck van Rhoon.

Bertrand Philip then started the first porcelain factory in the Netherlands in the town of Weesp in 1759. with Louis Gerverot as a painter. However, the enterprise went bankrupt and its goods and clays were temporarily stored in the Muiderslot and then sold to the minister Joannes de Mol.

== Bibliography ==
- Gabriëls, A.J.C.M. (1990) De heren als dienaren en de dienaar als heer. Het stadhouderlijk stelsel in de tweede helft van de achttiende eeuw, pp. 120–1, 170.
