= Wagner & Apel Porzellan =

German porcelain company

- Company type: Limited-liability company
- Founded: 1877
- Headquarters: Lippelsdorf, Germany
- Products: Porcelain, Figurines, Sculptures
- Website: http://www.wagner-apel.de/

Wagner & Apel Porzellan ( English : Wagner & Apel Porcelain ) is a porcelain manufacturer in the small town of Lippelsdorf in the Thuringian Forest. Since 1877, porcelain has been made there entirely by hand. The product range includes lifelike animal and bird sculptures, lovely child figurines, decorative Christmas and gift items, modern vessels in both traditional and modern styles. The family business is being run by the fourth and fifth generation.

== History ==
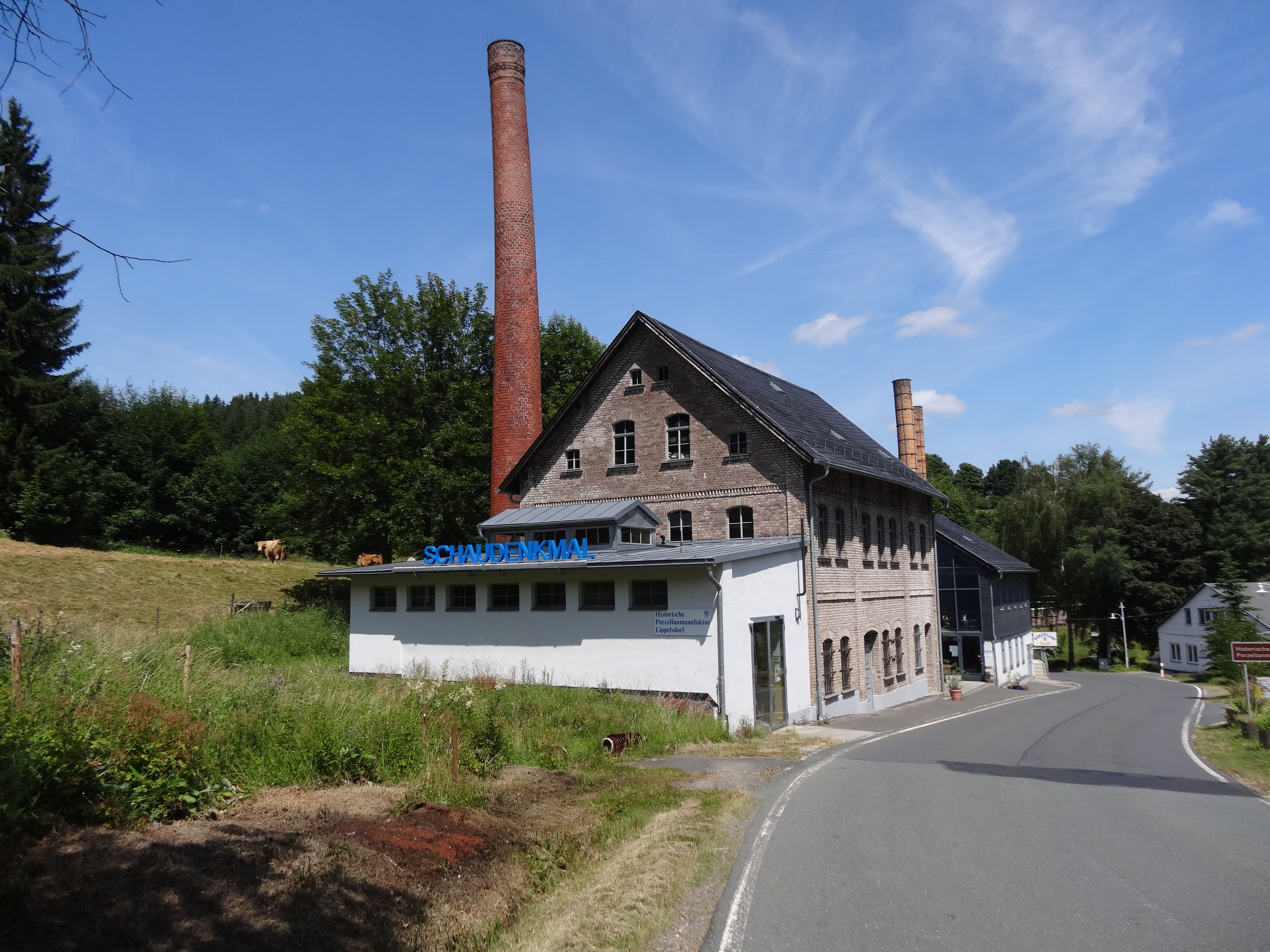
Wagner & Apel Porcelain Factory, 2013

In 1877 a porcelain factory was founded in Lippelsdorf with the name of “KUCH & Co.” The entry in the local register of properties was “kiln in town field built [ Brennofen in Ortsflur errichtet ]”. One of the founders was Bernhard Wagner. Since 31 May 1901, the owner Bernhard Wagner as well as Anton and Bernhard Apel operated under the name, “Wagner & Apel”. With them, the Lippelsdorf porcelain made its name all over the world.

In the beginning, the primary focus of the main production were pipe bowls, mugs, egg cups, figurines of bathing children, and other little export goods but, in 1901, it was changed to knick-knacks, animals and gift items. Over the years, the collection expanded to include small commercial items, such as cans, ashtrays, salt and pepper shakers, pin cushions, little containers for condiments such as spice, etc.

In this way, the factory continued from generation to generation. Like all the medium-sized businesses of the Communist East Germany, Wagner & Apel was made a special company with orders from the state. In 1972, the company was completely nationalized and formed under the name of “VEB Porzellanfiguren Lippelsdorf [ Lippeldsdorf Porcelain Figurines VEB ]”. Four years later, all the porcelain factories in the area were merged to become “VEB Vereinigte Zierporzellanwerke Lichte [ United Animal Porcelain Works of Lichte VEB ]”. Lippelsdorf then was assigned to its own Production Department of the Gräfenthal State Company. The company therefore lost all its independence as well as the power to make its own decisions. After the political changes, the descendants of Bernhard Wagner, Ingeborg Seibert and Helga Koch, requested the re-privatization of the factory, which then went into private ownership on 1 July 1990. The current shareholders of the GmbH (limited liability company) are Ingeborg Seibert and Helga Koch, with Hans-Heinrich Seibert as the Managing Director.

== Company names ==
- 1877 – 1883 : Porzellanmanufaktur Kuch & Co.
- 1883 – 1901 : Porzellanmanufaktur Wagner, Apel & Laube
- 1901 – 1948 : Porzellanmanufaktur Wagner & Apel
- 1949 – 1990 : VEB Porzellanfiguren Lippelsdorf
- 1990 – Current : Porzellanmanufaktur Wagner & Apel GmbH

== Historical manufacturing of porcelain ==
With the support of the Landesamtes für Denkmalpflege [ State Office for the Conservation of Historic Places ], the workshops of the old Thuringian craftsmanship were restored by 2002, the 125th anniversary of the company. To illustrate the process, the old factory was fitted with a multi-story circular stove for burning coal, a mass mill ( for grounding and mixing materials to create clay ) and a steam engine built in 1937. The old porcelain factory was appointed as the showpiece of 19th-century technology. Interested visitors would then have the opportunity of watching the traditional production of porcelain. In 2005, the Seibert family was awarded the Thüringer Denkmalschutzpreis [ Thuringian Prize for the Conservation of Historic Places ] in recognition of their achievements.

== See also ==
- List of current German porcelain manufacturers and producers

== Literature ==
- (in German) Ekkehardt Kraemer (ed.) : Sächsisch–thüringisches Manufakturporzellan ( Berlin : Glas Keramik Volkseigener Außenhandelsbetrieb der Deutschen Demokratischen Republik [ Ceramic Glass, Nationally Owned Foreign-Trade Companies of the German Democratic Republic ], 1985 ). 3rd Expanded Edition, 1987, pages 24–27.
