= Hogeweyk =

Gated model village in Weesp, Netherlands

Coordinates: 52.3143°N 5.029°E

De Hogeweyk, operated by nursing home Hogewey, is a gated model village in Weesp, Netherlands. It has been designed specifically as a pioneering care facility for elderly people with dementia. The benefit of using all-day reminiscence therapy at Hogewey, compared to traditional nursing homes, is that the residents with dementia are more active and require less medication.

== Layout ==
The Hogewey complex is set out like a village with a town square, supermarket, hairdressing salon, theatre, pub, café-restaurant—as well as the twenty-three houses themselves. In 2018 four houses were added to The Hogeweyk. Each house reflects a style that is common to, and familiar for, the six or seven people who live in that house. The seven settings provided are:

- Stedelijk, for those used to living in an urban area
- Goois, with an aristocratic Dutch feel
- Ambachtelijk for those used to working as trades people or craftsmen/women
- Indisch for those with an association with Indonesia and the former Dutch East Indies
- Huiselijk for homemakers
- Cultureel for those brought up with theatre and cinema
- Christelijk for those with a central religious aspect to life, whether Christian or another religion.

The doctors, nurses and carers aim to make the experience as real as possible to the residents. Residents shop at the supermarket and assist with preparing and cooking as they would at home. The carers wear normal daytime clothing rather than clinical clothing and fit into a role that the people living with dementia are likely to be comfortable with; in the working class households the carers are seen to be neighbours or friends, while in the aristocratic/upper class setting, the nurses act akin to servants. The living styles have different types of music playing, significantly varied interior design, food and methods of table setting. Residents in each house have their own large bedroom and meet with other residents to share the living room, kitchen and dining room. The village employs 250 staff.

The institute has made place for normality and highly trained staff support the residents; if residents are confused they have various methods to make them feel at ease. However, the staff will not deceive the patients if directly asked, truthfully stating that the residents are in a place where they can receive required care for their condition. Because of the nature of Alzheimer's disease and dementia, the residents can remember the distant past but not the present, so even truthful answers given by the staff will be forgotten quickly.

== History ==
The first ideas for the village came about in 1992, from the management team (including Yvonne van Amerongen, Jannette Spiering, e.o) at the traditional nursing home Hogewey after discussing how if their parents became affected by Alzheimer's in the future, they would not want them to endure hospital-like care. After a series of research and brainstorming sessions in 1993, the outcome was that normality should prevail in all kind of aspect of nursing home care. This vision was called "normalized small scale living for people with dementia". One of the aspects was that they decided that people generally prefer to surround and interact with other like-minded people of similar backgrounds and experiences. The arrangement at Hogewey provides this by ensuring that residents with similar backgrounds, norms and values continue to live closely together.

The Hogeweyk facility was designed by architects Molenaar&Bol&VanDillen, and opened in December 2009 on four acres of land. It consists of low two-story brick buildings, and amenities such as a supermarket and theatre. Construction of the new Hogeweyk facilities cost €19.3 million and was funded primarily by the Dutch government providing €17.8 million, plus €1.5 million in funding and sponsorship from local organisations.

The café–restaurant is also open to the public and the theater is hired by local businesses, both of which help with running costs. The cost per resident is similar to more traditional nursing homes at around €5,000 per month.

Amerongen was Hogeweys manager on Quality & Innovation at Vivium—the government-owned company that runs Hogewey. Jannette Spiering became director in 2001 and commissioned the build of The Hogeweyk Because of the amount of foreign interest and foreign visitors, The business unit Be, The Hogeweyk care concept was created.

Yvonne and Jannette are still active as senior consultants.
