= Arzberg porcelain =

German porcelain trademark

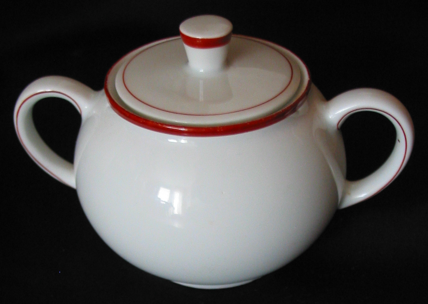
Form 1382 sugarbowl with red rim

Arzberg is the trademark of a German manufacturer of porcelain, founded in 1887 in Arzberg, Bavaria. Its fame is largely based on designs by Hermann Gretsch, whose Form 1382, conceived in 1931 and based on Bauhaus principles, marks a milestone in modern design; Form 1382 is still produced today, and sold worldwide. Hutschenreuther AG, holder of the Arzberg trademark since 1972, was dissolved in 2000 and the trademark was taken over by SKV-Porzellan-Union GmbH, founded in 1993 by the porcelain companies Schirnding, Kronester and Johann Seltmann Vohenstrauß. In 2004, SKV-Porzellan-Union GmbH was renamed Arzberg-Porzellan GmbH. In 2003, the company had approximately 250 employees. Since 2000, however, the headquarters of the company holding the trademark Arzberg (and Schirnding as well) are located in Schirnding, where production took place. After 10 years Arzberg GmbH announced its insolvency. Today the trademark is owned by Rosenthal porcelain.

From circa 1915 to 1927, Arzberg used the export trademark ″Oremont″.

== Designers ==
- Hermann Gretsch (1895–1950) - 1382 range
- Heinrich Löffelhardt (1901–1979) - Form 2000 range
- Peter Schmidt (1937-...) - Design 2006 range
- Dieter Sieger (1938-...) - Cult range
- Hans-Wilhelm Seitz (1945-...) - Cucina range, Daily range, Move range
- David Palterer (1949-...) - Cult Flying Object pattern
- Michael Sieger (1968-...) - Tric range

== See also ==
- Porcelain manufacturing companies in Europe
