= Weesp =

- City
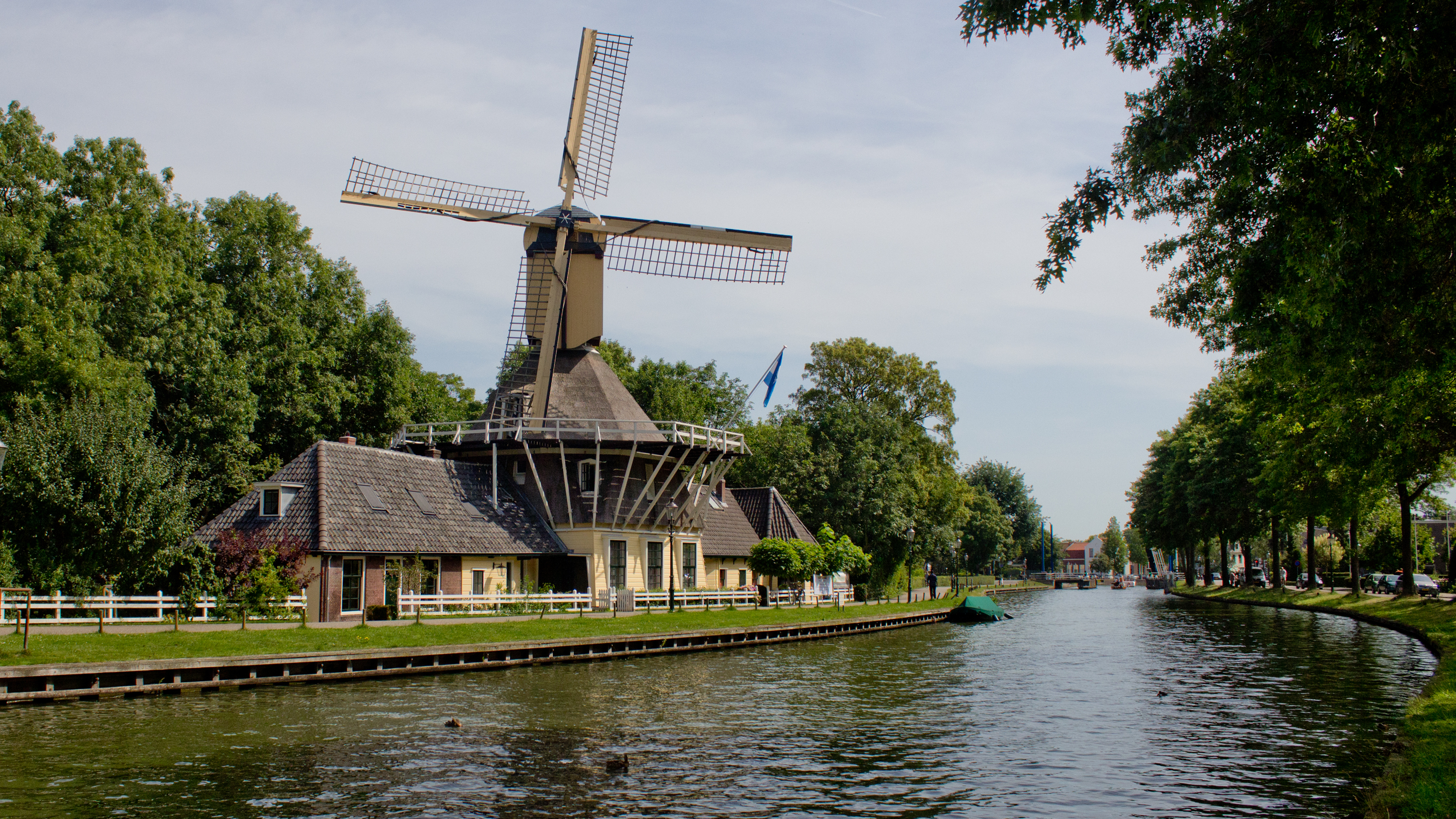
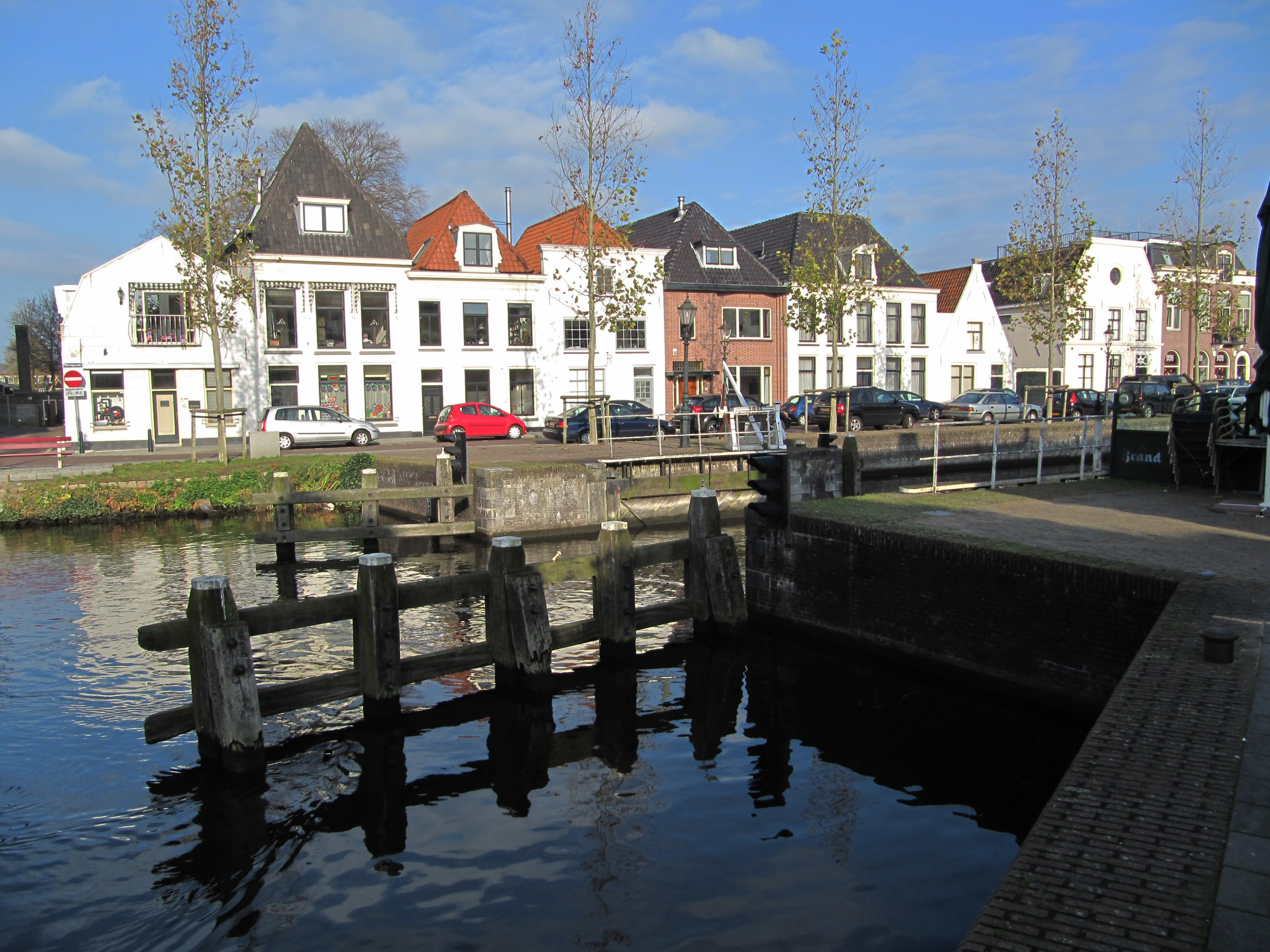
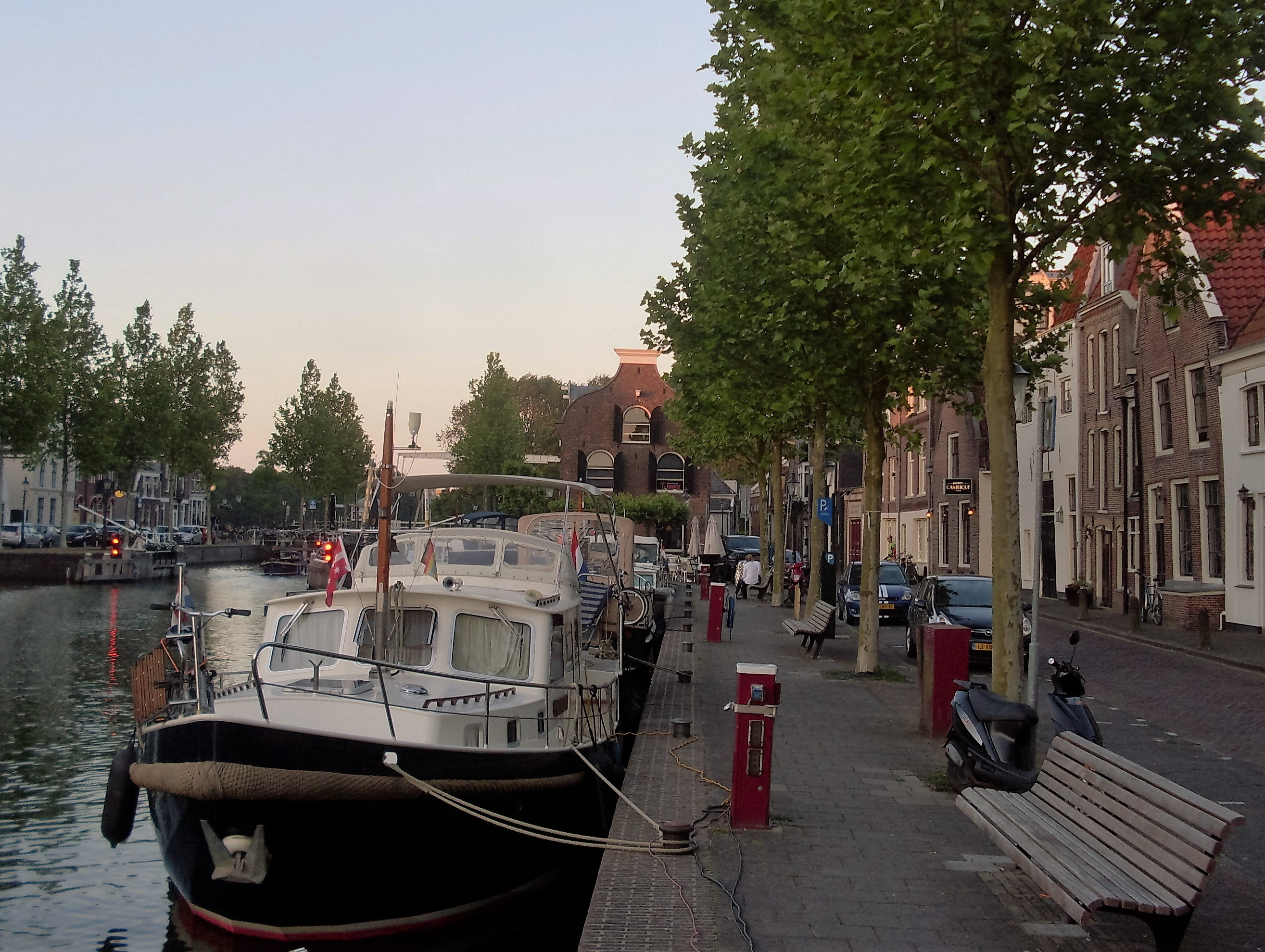
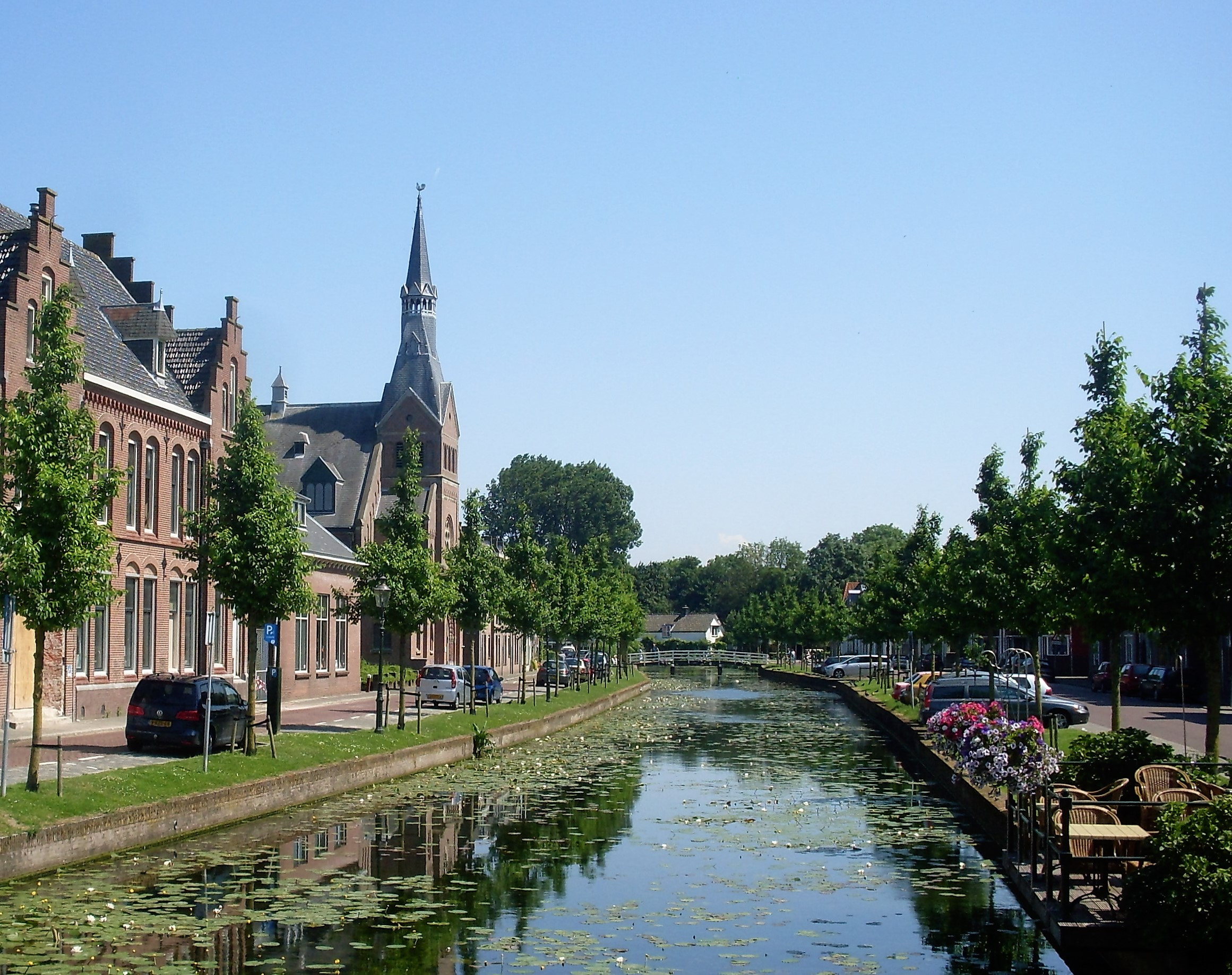
- Images, from top down, left to right: 't Haantje windmill, Herengracht, city docks and Vechtstreek

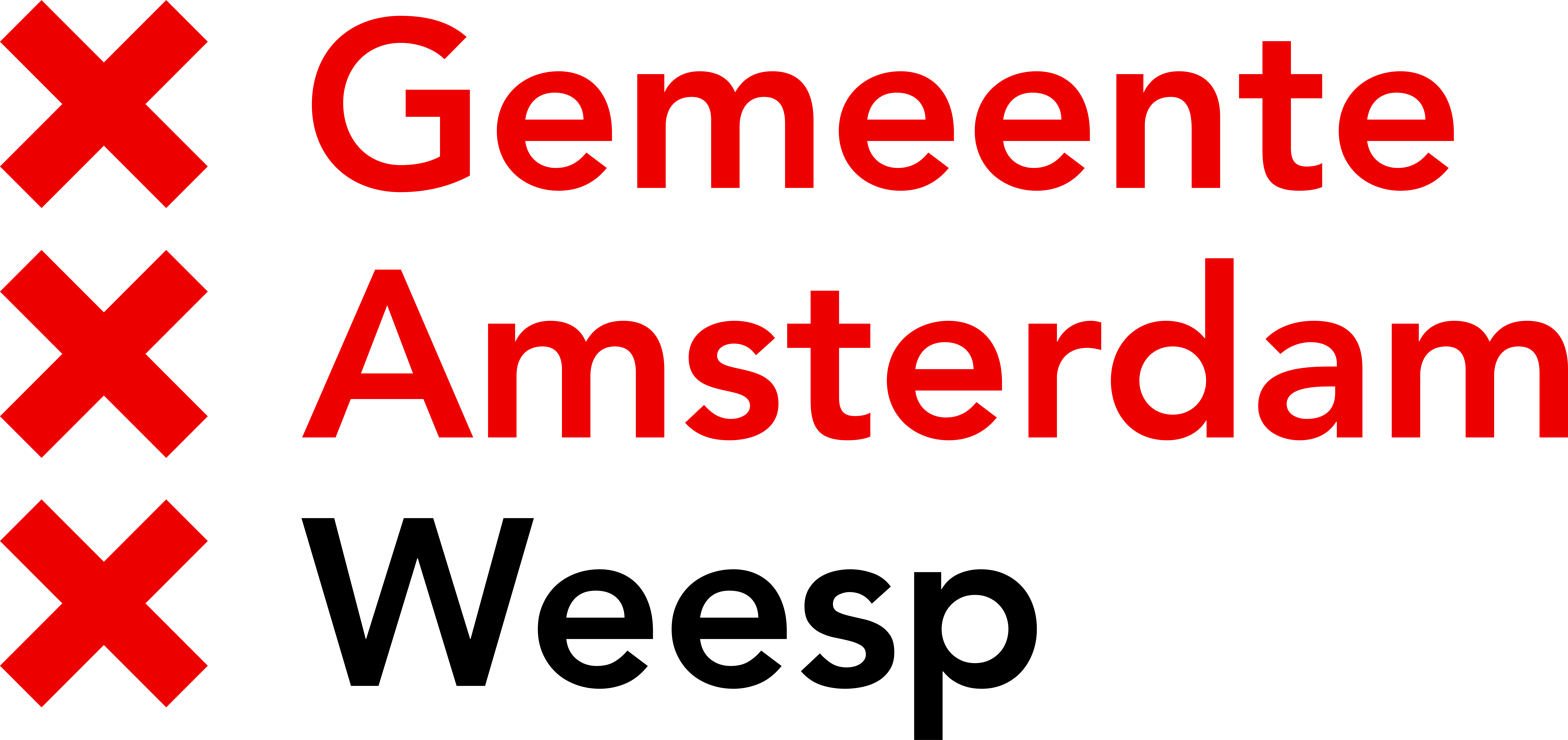
- Flag Coat of arms Brandmark

- Location in North Holland
- Coordinates: 52°18′N 5°3′E
- Country: Netherlands
- Province: North Holland
- Municipality: Amsterdam

Area
  - Total: 24.16 km^{2} (9.33 sq mi)
  - Land: 22.79 km^{2} (8.80 sq mi)
  - Water: 1.37 km^{2} (0.53 sq mi)
- Elevation: 1 m (3.3 ft)

Population (January 2021)
  - Total: 20,445
  - Density: 897/km^{2} (2,320/sq mi)
- Demonym: Weesper
- Time zone: UTC+1 (CET)
  - Summer (DST): UTC+2 (CEST)
- Postcode: 1380–1384
- Area code: 0294
- Website: www.amsterdam.nl/stadsdelen/weesp/

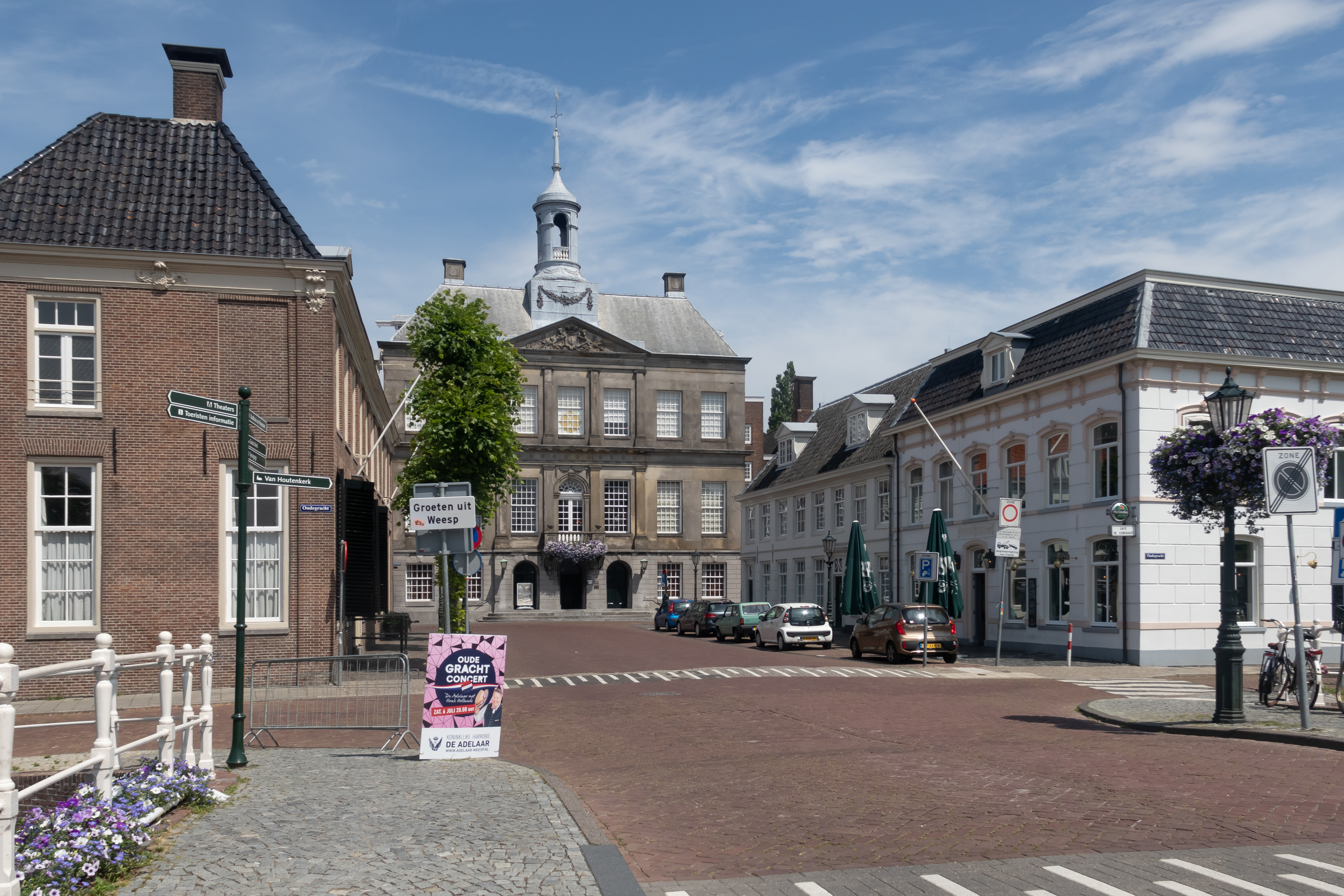
Weesp, former city hall - nowadays museum

Weesp (Dutch pronunciation: [ʋeːsp]) is a city and an urban area in the municipality of Amsterdam in the province of North Holland, Netherlands. It had a population of 20,445 in 2021. It lies on the river Vecht and next to the Amsterdam–Rhine Canal in an area called the Vechtstreek. The former municipality of Weesp merged with Amsterdam on 24 March 2022.

== History ==
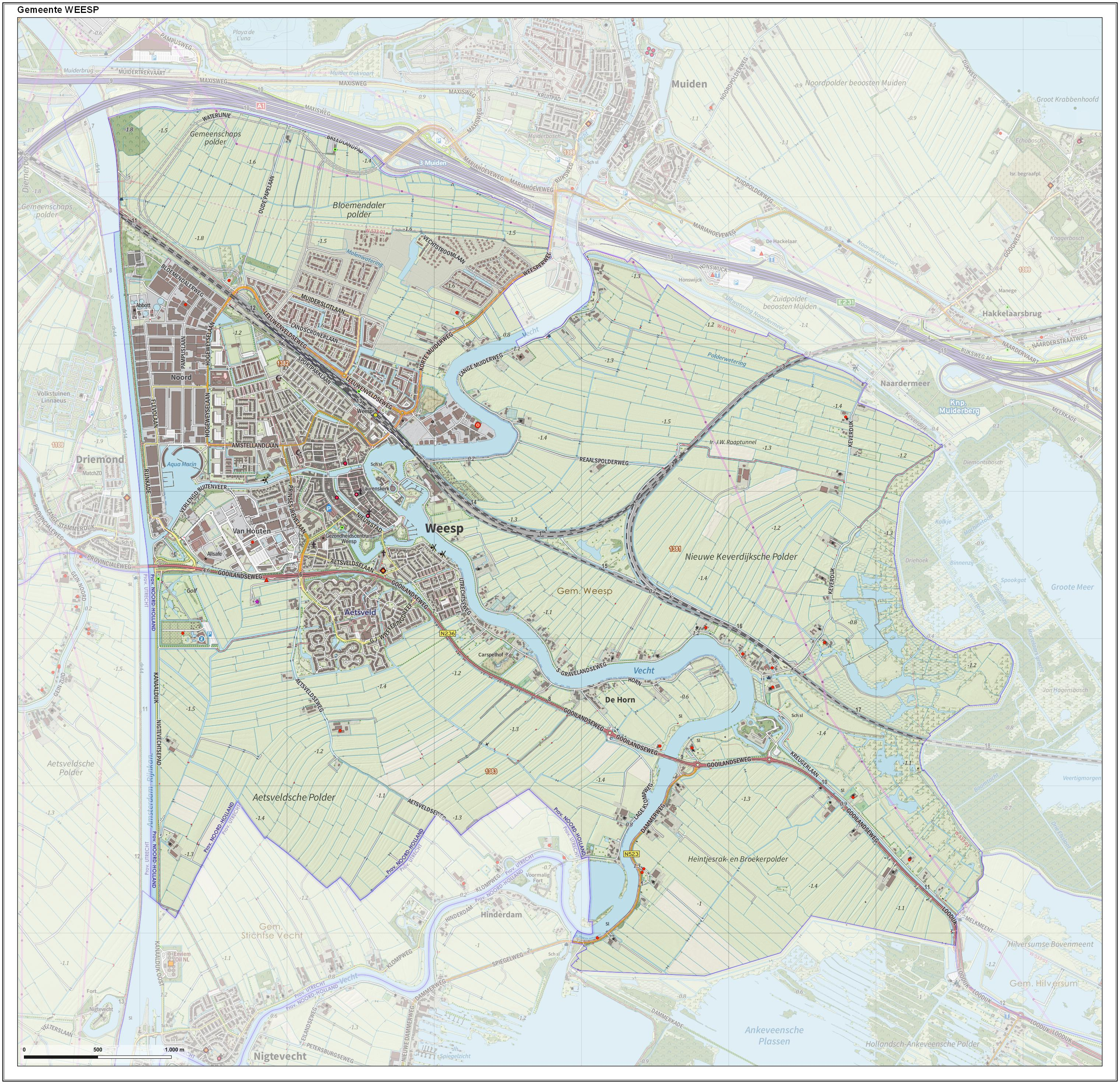
Topographic map of Weesp, January 2016

Until the early Middle Ages the region around Weesp was an uninhabited peat bog. Weesp (Wesopa in Latin documents) was granted city rights in 1355 and celebrated its 650th anniversary as a city in 2005.

From the late Middle Ages, the river Vecht was a defensive line for the County of Holland and it remained a military defensive line until the Second World War. Weesp was strongly fortified, more than its size would justify; for most of its history it had a few thousand inhabitants.

The defensive lines consisted of inundation zones, which would be flooded in wartime (the Hollandic Water Line). Behind them were fortified towns, forts, barracks and other military structures. The most comprehensive was the Defence Line of Amsterdam (Stelling van Amsterdam), a circular inundation zone around Amsterdam, a UNESCO World Heritage Site.

After the Second World War, new housing was built in the west and an industrial zone with a harbour at the Amsterdam-Rhine Canal was constructed. In the 1970s a suburb was built on the south. Another suburb was built in the north which recently expanded with plans for further expansion.

Before the reformation the church was dedicated to Saint Lawrence. It is still in use for Protestant services. In the tower it has a famous carillon by Pieter Hemony cast in 1671. Following the 19th Century emancipation of Dutch Catholics, a Catholic church was erected in Weesp.

The Dutch government considered Weesp too small to continue as an independent municipality. In a 2018 referendum, 57.4% of the inhabitants voted in favor of a merger with Amsterdam. On 1 June 2019 the civil service offices of the municipality of Weesp merged with those of the municipality of Amsterdam in preparation of the merger of the two municipalities. Bas Jan van Bochove was the last mayor of the municipality of Weesp until the merger was finalized on 24 March 2022.

== Population centres ==
The municipality of Weesp consisted of three towns: De Horn, Uitermeer, and Weesp. The north of the city of Weesp is known for its Hogewey dementia village.

== Economy ==
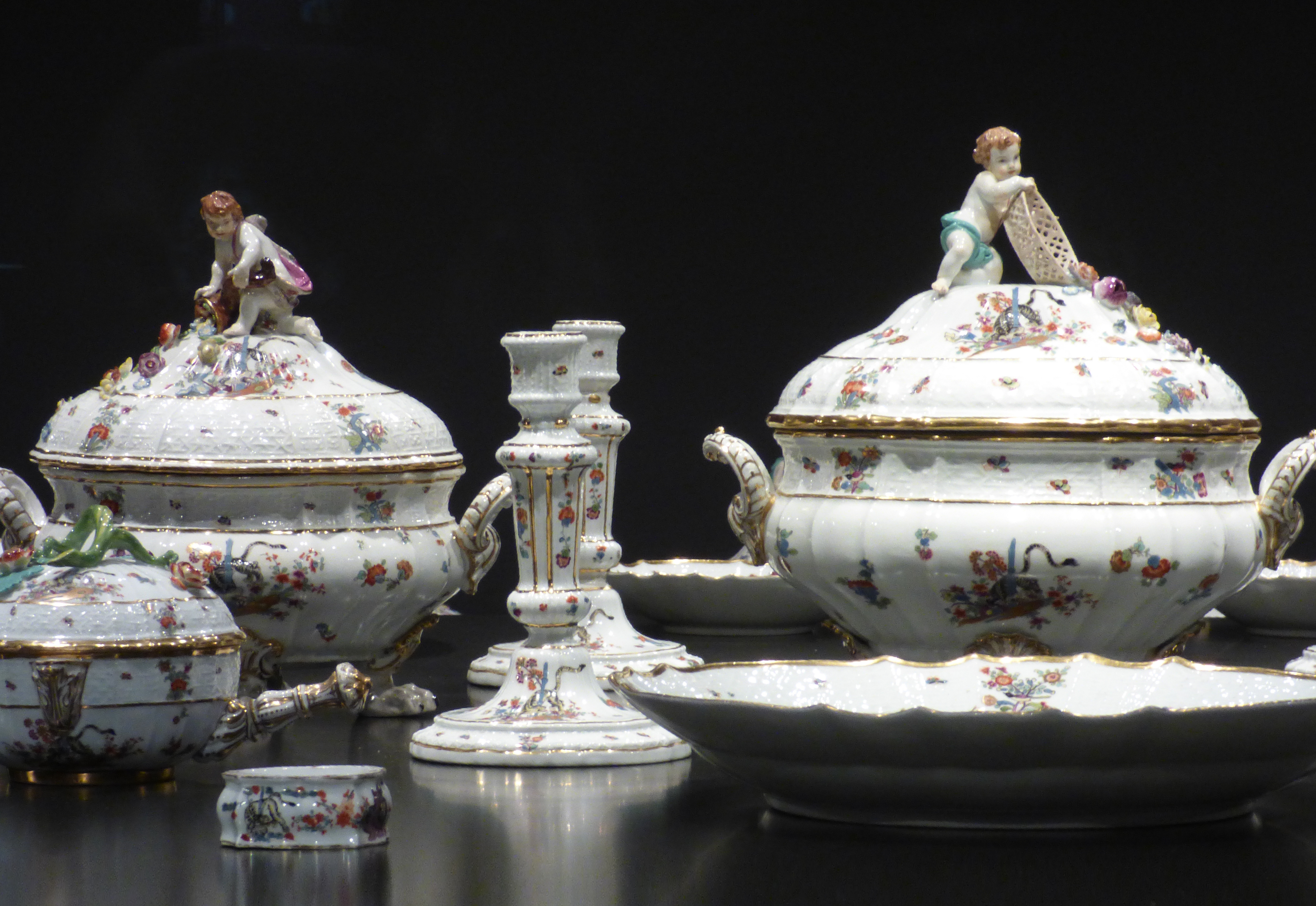
Parts of tableware from the porcelain factory of Weesp, c. 1764-1768. Rijks Museum.

The first Dutch porcelain originated in Weesp and dates to 1759. The venture was led by Bertrand Philip, Count of Gronsveld.

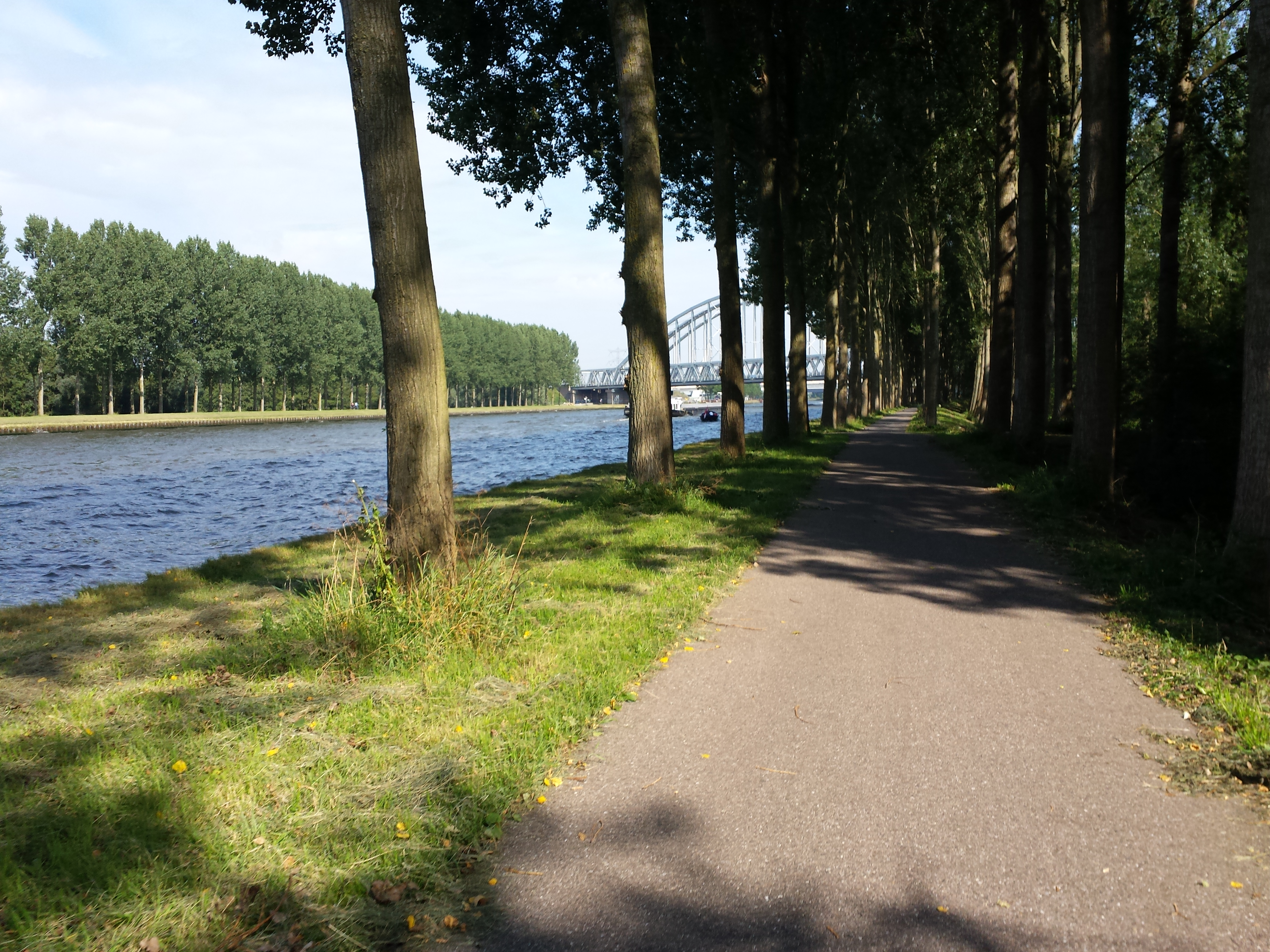
Amsterdam–Rhine Canal

The most famed product of Weesp is Van Houten chocolate. Before cocoa production, the local economy had been based on beer breweries, jenever distilleries, production of Weesper porcelain, and trade, due to its location on a branch point of waterways. In the 21st century, the economy is very diverse.

There were large facilities of Solvay Pharmaceuticals, until February 2010 when Abbott Laboratories of North Chicago, Illinois acquired Solvay Pharmaceuticals. At this site there is a chemical plant which manufactures active pharmaceutical ingredient for Abbott brands Duphalac and Duphaston and a biologic plant which manufactures active pharmaceutical ingredient for Abbott's flu vaccine Influvac. The local specialty is the Weesper Mop cookie, which is based on mashed almond.

== Tourism ==
Weesp is a popular stop for tourists. It has a protected historical center with canals and many buildings dating from the seventeenth and eighteenth century. Weesp has three full-size historical windmills. It features a bastion and fortifications that are part of the Defense line of Amsterdam and the Dutch Water Line. These structures have never been attacked, though. The scenic river Vecht and the small roads that line it attract yachters and cyclists. The Naardermeer area, the first nature reserve in the Netherlands, is at 15 minutes cycling distance from Weesp; it protects the Gooi landscape. The Weesp local museum is located in the former city hall.

== Urban area government ==
The seats in the Weesp administrative committee elected on 16 March 2022 for four years are divided between the political parties as follows :

- Weesper Stadspartij – 3 seats
- GroenLinks – 2 seats
- Christian Democratic Appeal – 2 seats
- People's Party for Freedom and Democracy – 2 seats
- Democrats 66 – 1 seat
- Labour Party – 1 seat

== Transport ==
Weesp has one railway station, Weesp. It serves as a transfer station for passengers on local trains on the Amsterdam–Amersfoort (Oosterspoorweg) and Amsterdam Airport Schiphol–Almere (Schiphollijn and Flevolijn) lines, which bundle up just before Weesp and diverge right after. Weesp therefore benefits from 16 departures per hour, serving many destinations including Amsterdam Centraal, Schiphol Airport, Hilversum, Amersfoort Centraal and Utrecht Centraal four times per hour.

In front of the railway station there is a small bus station with services to neighbouring towns and villages such as Muiden, Muiderberg, and Nigtevecht and to Amsterdam Bijlmer ArenA station.

== Notable people ==
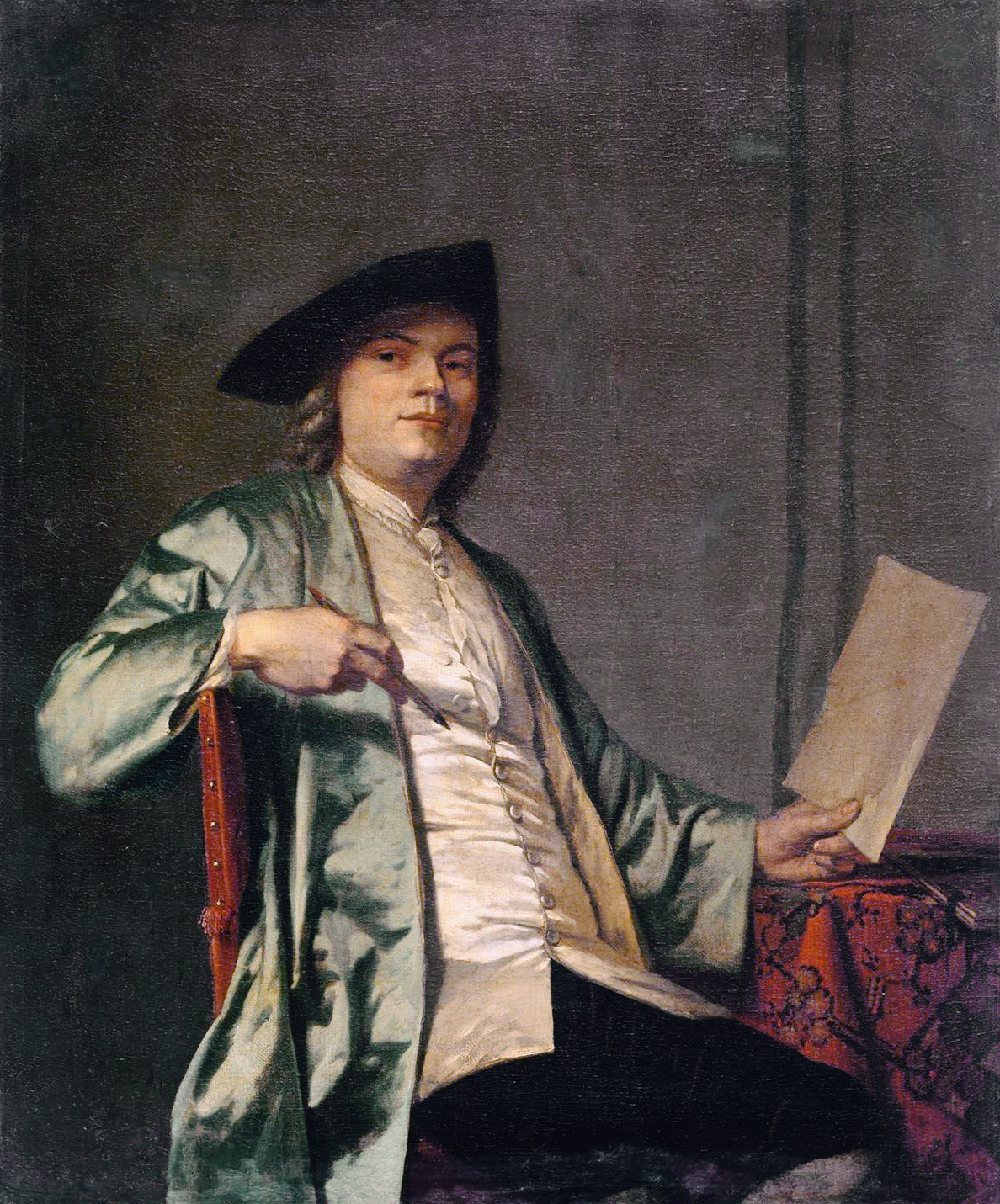
Portrait of Cornelis Ploos van Amstel, c. 1758

- Thomas Hees (1634–1693) a Dutch diplomat, negotiated for the Seventeen Provinces with the Barbary corsairs
- Salomon van Til (1643–1713) a theologian of the Dutch Reformed Church
- Bernardus van Schijndel (1647–1709) a Dutch Golden Age painter of small scale genre works
- Cornelis Ploos van Amstel (1726–1798) a Dutch painter and art collector
- Coenraad Johannes van Houten (1801–1887 in Weesp) a Dutch chemist and chocolate maker
- Willy Mullens (1880–1952) a Dutch producer, director, and promoter of movies
- Phemia Molkenboer (1883–1940) a Dutch ceramist, furniture designer and art teacher
- Willem van Beusekom (1947–2006) a Dutch broadcaster, TV presenter and radio DJ
- Wendy van Dijk (born 1971) a Dutch actress and TV presenter

=== Sport ===
- Marco Ruitenbeek (born 1968) a former Dutch footballer with over 250 club caps
- Antoni Hardonk (born 1976) a Dutch mixed martial artist and kickboxer

== See also ==
- Porcelain manufacturing companies in Europe
- Bertrand Philip, Count of Gronsveld
