= Fürstenberg China =

Porcelain factory in Germany

Coordinates: 51°43′56.1″N 9°23′56.7″E

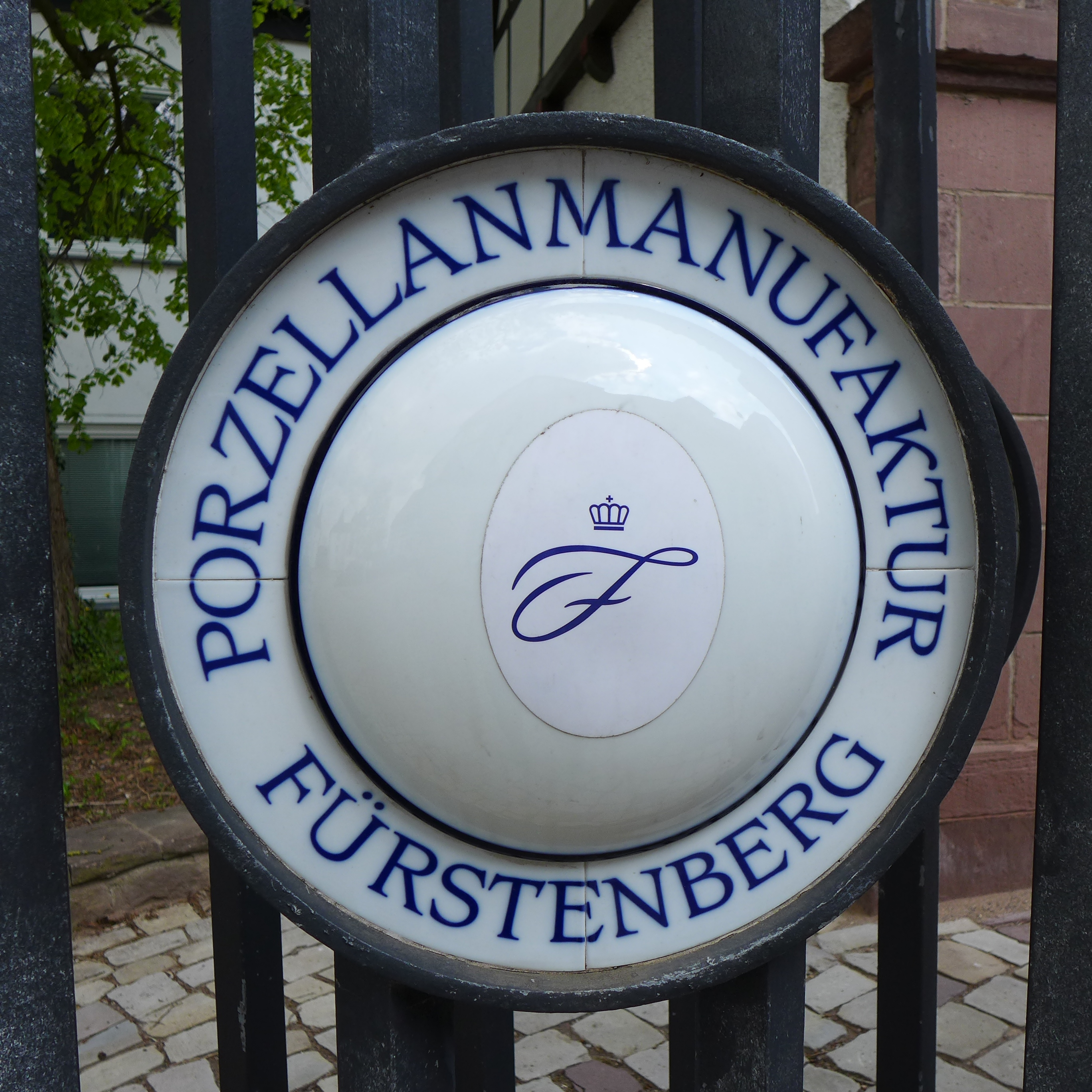
Porcelain plate on the castle gate

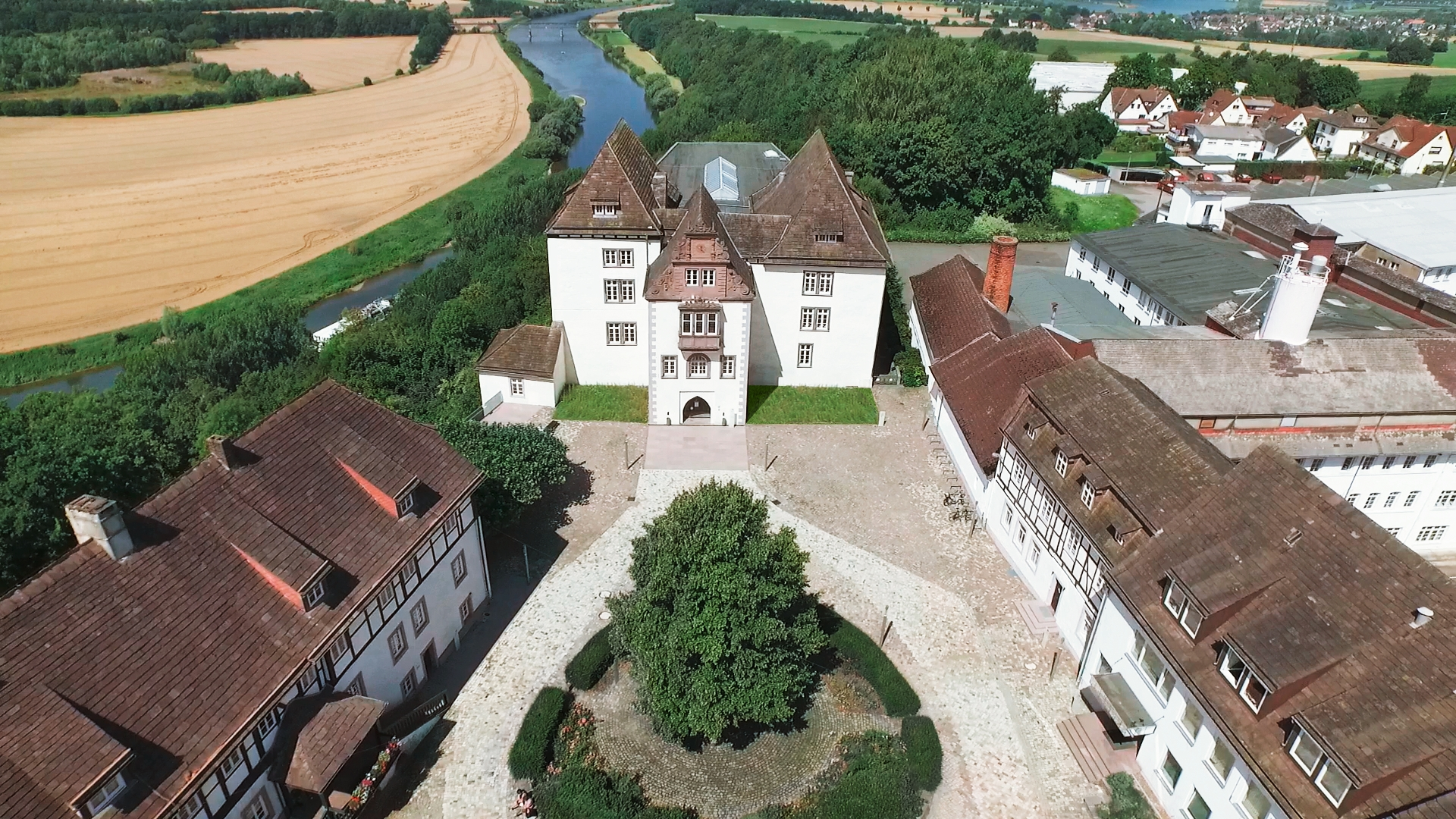
Fürstenberg Castle building complex – the central building housing the porcelain museum

The Fürstenberg China Factory (German: Porzellanmanufaktur Fürstenberg) was founded on 11 January 1747 in Fürstenberg, on the Weser river, by Johann Georg von Langen at the direction of Duke Charles I of Brunswick-Wolfenbüttel. It is the second-oldest porcelain manufacturer in Germany that still operates on its original site (Note: While Höchst Porzellan (1746) is Germany's second-oldest porcelain manufacturer by opening date, it no longer operates on its original site.).

From 1888, the operation was turned into a public limited company (Aktiengesellschaft). In 1966, the firm became a limited liability company (GmbH) with its parent company, Braunschweig GmbH, and therefore a 100 per cent subsidiary of NORD/LB. Its current managing director is Stephanie Saalfeld.

== Museum ==
The Weser Renaissance-style castle, high above the Weser river, traces its history back to a medieval castle built in the first half of the 14th century (first mentioned around 1355), and was converted into a hunting lodge around 1600 by Duke Henry Julius of Brunswick-Wolfenbüttel. Until 1972, china was produced in the castle itself, but now, manufacturing is carried out in the adjacent, modern buildings.

Today, the castle houses the firm's museum and gives an overview of production from its beginnings during the rococo period to the present day. Other notable collections of Fürstenberg china may be seen in the North German museums at Brunswick, Schwerin and Wolfenbüttel, as well as in Weimar.

== See also ==
- Porcelain manufacturing companies in Europe

== Sources ==
- Karin Annette Möller: Porzellan aus Fürstenberg, Katalog, Schwerin 2002, ISBN 3-86106-073-6
- Beatrix Freifrau Wolff Metternich u.a.: Die Porzellanmanufaktur Fürstenberg, 2 Bände, Prestel-Verlag, 2004
