= Skároš =

Village and municipality in Slovakia

- Municipality
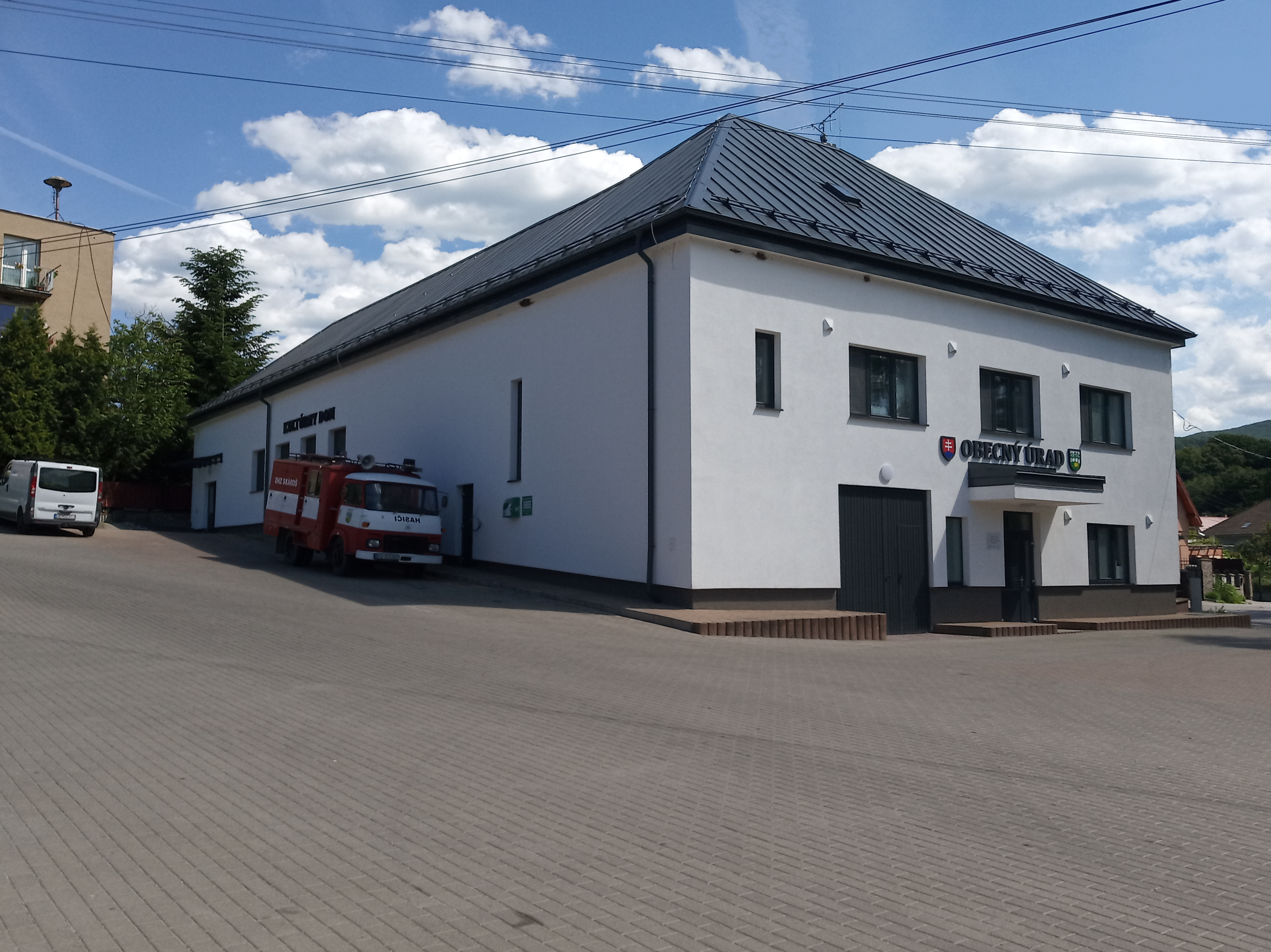

- Flag

- Location of Skároš in the Košice Region Location of Skároš in Slovakia
- Coordinates: 48.58°N 21.38°E
- Country: Slovakia
- Region: Košice Region
- District: Košice-okolie District
- First mentioned: 1270

Area
  - Total: 36.87 km^{2} (14.24 sq mi)
- Elevation: 236 m (774 ft)

Population (2025)
  - Total: 1,171
- Time zone: UTC+1 (CET)
  - Summer (DST): UTC+2 (CEST)
- Postal code: 441 1
- Area code: +421 55
- Vehicle registration plate (until 2022): KS
- Website: www.skaros.sk

Skároš (Hungarian: Eszkáros) is a village and municipality in Košice-okolie District in the Kosice Region of eastern Slovakia.

== History ==
In historical records the village was first mentioned in 1270 (Skarus), when it belonged to Trstené pri Hornáde.

== Geography ==
The municipality lies at an altitude of 236 metres (774 ft) and covers an area of 36.87 km^{2} (14.24 sq mi) (2025).

== Population ==
Population statistic (10 years)
Year	1995	2005	2015	2025
Count	965	1070	1114	1171
Difference		+10.88%	+4.11%	+5.11%

Population statistic
Year	2024	2025
Count	1162	1171
Difference		+0.77%

It has a population of 1171 people (31 December 2025).

=== Ethnicity ===
Census 2021 (1+ %)
Ethnicity	Number	Fraction
Slovak	1062	95.84%
Romani	55	4.96%
Not found out	28	2.52%
Total	1108	

In year 2021 was 1108 people by ethnicity 1062 as Slovak, 55 as Romani, 28 as Not found out, 7 as Rusyn, 5 as Hungarian, 3 as Polish, 2 as Czech and 1 as Russian.

Note on population: The difference values of population numbers in the table "Population statistic" and in the sections "Ethnicity" & "Religion" is caused by the use of various statistical methods.

=== Religion ===
Census 2021 (1+ %)
Religion	Number	Fraction
Roman Catholic Church	912	82.31%
None	67	6.05%
Calvinist Church	57	5.14%
Not found out	22	1.99%
Greek Catholic Church	19	1.71%
Evangelical Church	12	1.08%
Total	1108	

In year 2021 was 1108 people by religion 912 from Roman Catholic Church, 67 from None, 57 from Calvinist Church, 22 from Not found out, 19 from Greek Catholic Church, 12 from Evangelical Church, 8 from Christian Congregations in Slovakia, 3 from United Methodist Church, 2 from Eastern Orthodox Church, 2 from Jehovah's Witnesses, 1 from Jewish community, 1 from Other and not ascertained christian church, 1 from Other and 1 from Ad hoc movements.
