= Apulum (company) =

- Company type: Porcelain manufacturer
- Industry: Ceramics
- Founded: 1970; 56 years ago
- Headquarters: Alba Iulia, Romania
- Number of employees: Slightly under 1,000
- Website: Apulum

Apulum, officially S.C. Apulum S.A. is a manufacturer of porcelain products, founded in Alba Iulia in 1970. It is Romania's largest porcelain producer and one of the main European exporters.

== See also ==
- Porcelain manufacturing companies in Europe
