= Dulyovo porcelain works =

Russian porcelain manufacturer

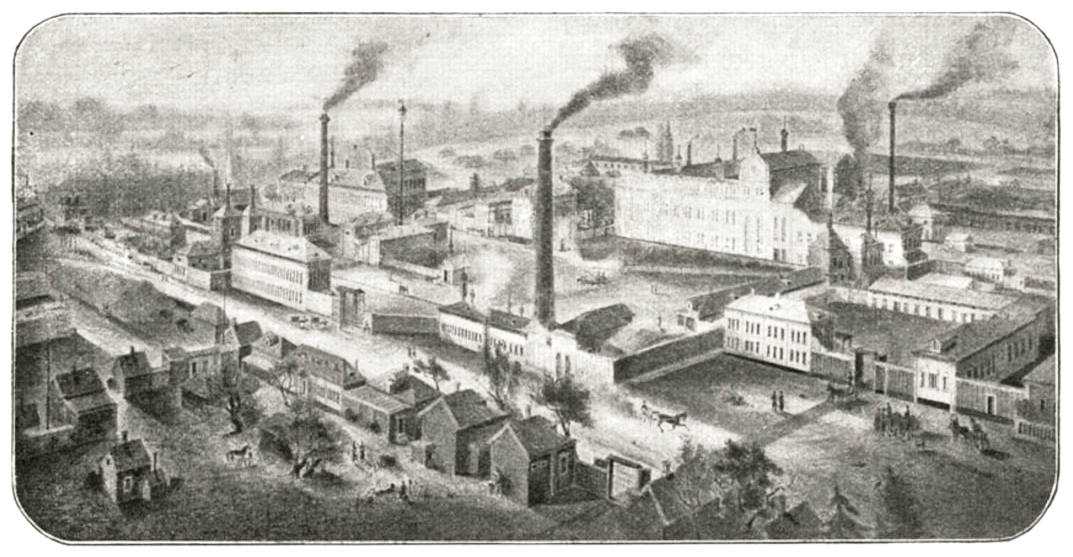
The Kuznetsov porcelain factory in 1889

Dulyovo porcelain works is a Russian porcelain manufacturer based in the Moscow Oblast. Its products are better known as Dulevo porcelain. The works were founded in the Dulyovo wasteland (now Likino-Dulyovo) in 1832 by merchant Terenti Kuznetsov from Gzhel.

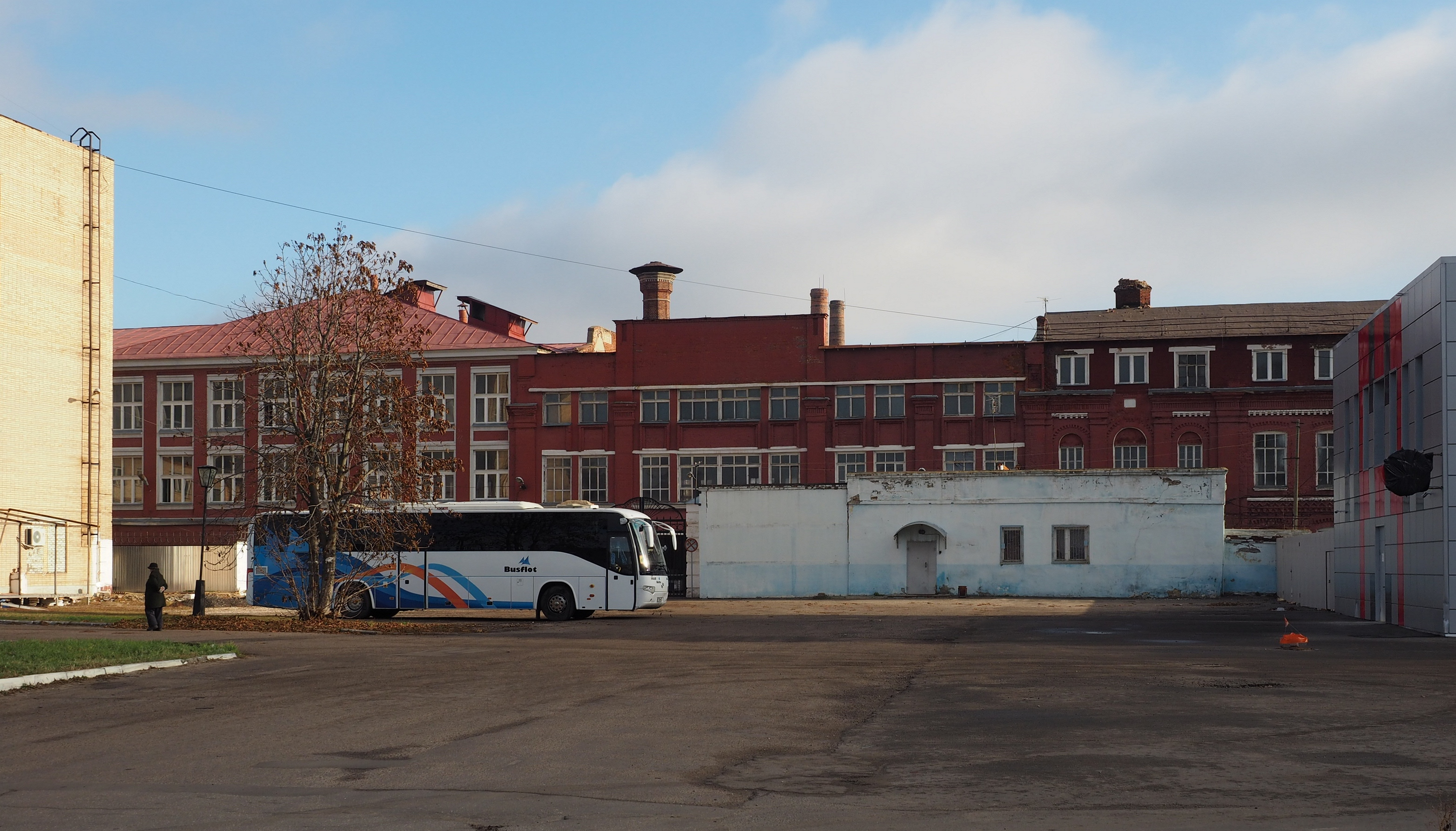
Porcelain works building

Dulevo porcelain factory produced many sets and sculptures during the Soviet period. Designers included Pyotr Vasilyevich Leonov, Mikhail Mikhailovich Adamovich (between 1927 and 1933), Alexey Georgievich Sotnikov, Vladimir Klimentyevich Yasnetsov, Asta Davydovna Brzhezitskaya, Olga Mikhailovna Bogdanova, Evgeniya Ilyinichna Gatilova, and Nina Aleksandrovna Malysheva. Some designs were created by the Hungarian-born Eva Zeisel, before she fell foul of Stalin.

Dulyovo porcelain has gained gold awards at world's fairs in Paris (1937, for Leonov's tea set "Beauty") and Brussels (1958, for "The Falcon"). In 1976 the factory was awarded the Order of Lenin.
