= Fürstenberg, Lower Saxony =

Fürstenberg
- Municipality
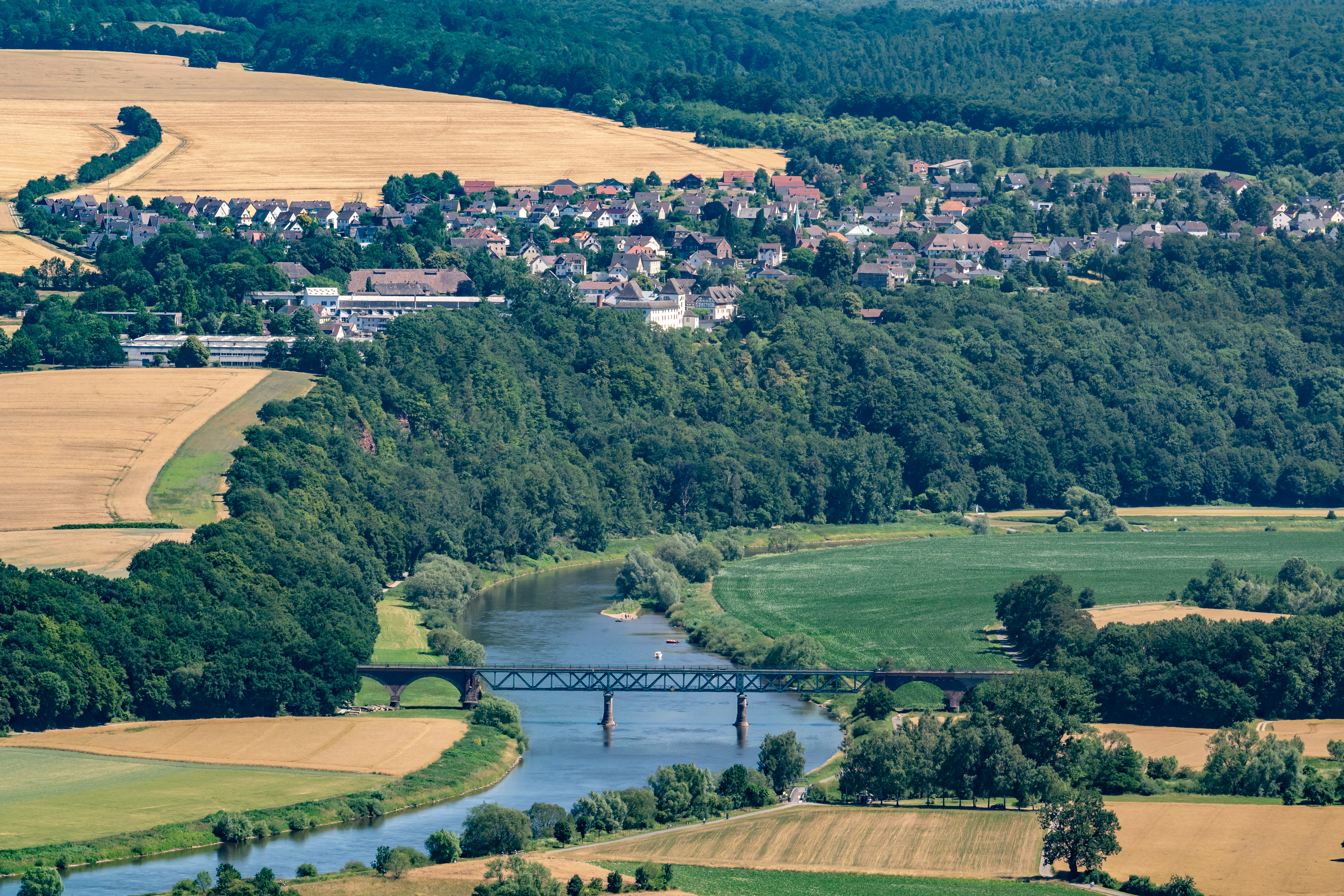
- Fürstenberg seen from Brunsberg

- Coat of arms

- Location of Fürstenberg within Holzminden district
- Interactive map of Fürstenberg
- Location within Germany Location within Lower Saxony
- Coordinates: 51°44′N 09°24′E
- Country: Germany
- State: Lower Saxony
- District: Holzminden
- Municipal assoc.: Boffzen

Government
  - Mayor: Michael Weber (SPD)

Area
  - Total: 3.22 km^{2} (1.24 sq mi)
- Elevation: 242 m (794 ft)

Population (2025-12-31)
  - Total: 998
  - Density: 310/km^{2} (803/sq mi)
- Time zone: UTC+01:00 (CET)
  - Summer (DST): UTC+02:00 (CEST)
- Postal codes: 37699
- Dialling codes: 05271
- Vehicle registration: HOL
- Website: www.gemeinde-fuerstenberg.de

Fürstenberg (German pronunciation: [ˈfʏʁstn̩ˌbɛʁk]) is a municipality in the district of Holzminden, in Lower Saxony, Germany and lies on the Weser river in the Weser Uplands, near Höxter and Holzminden. The Fürstenberg China Factory, founded in 1747, is the third-oldest porcelain manufacturer in Germany.
