= Gardner Manufacture =

The Gardner Porcelain Factory was a Russian Porcelain Factory founded by Francis Gardner in 1766. It was established in the village of Verbilki located near Moscow. The factory was successful during the 18th and 19th centuries. In the 1770s it received a commission from Catherine the Great but was sold to M.S. Kuznetsov in 1890.
