= Endre Szász =

Hungarian artist (1926–2003)

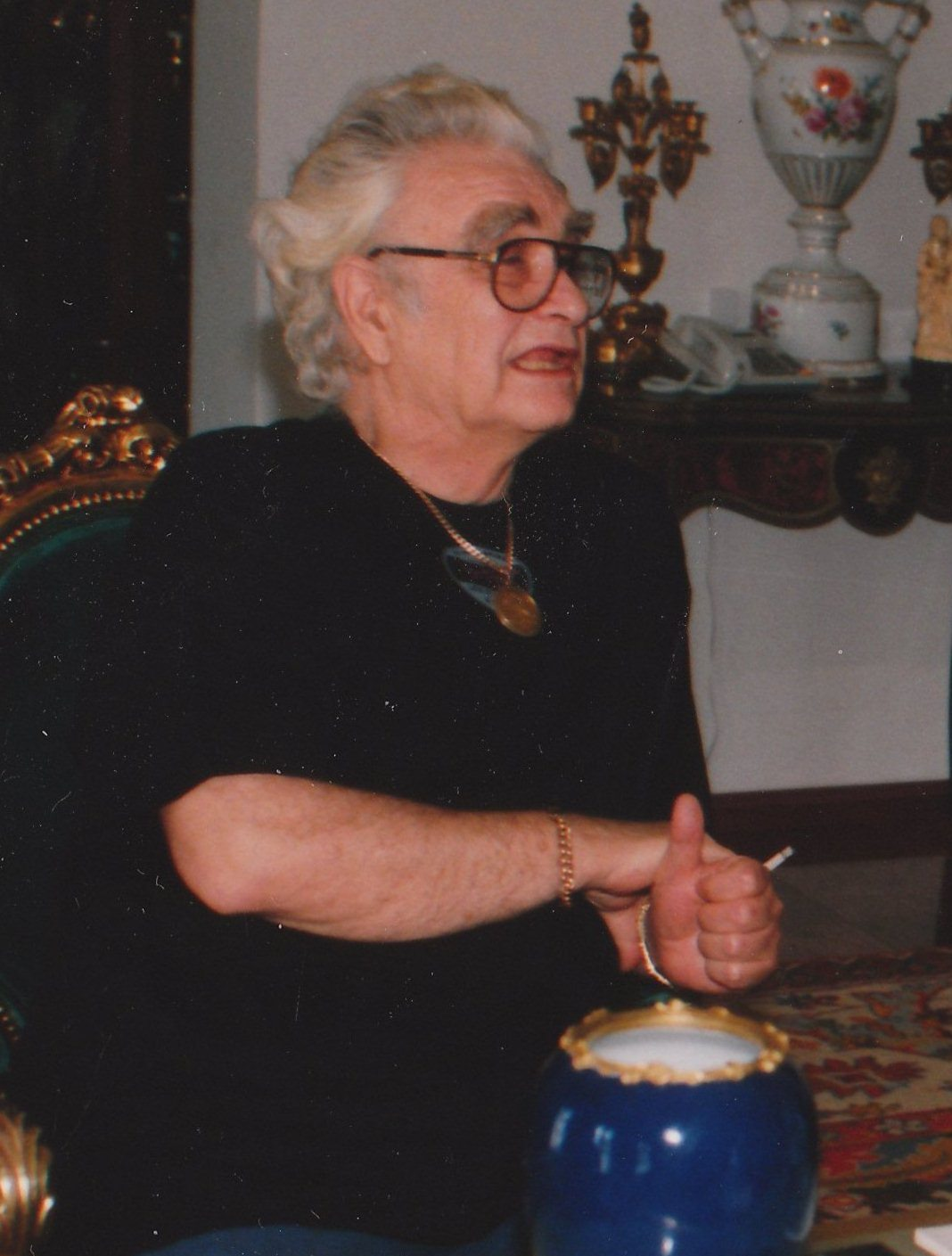
- Born: January 7, 1926; Miercurea Ciuc, Romania
- Died: 18 August 2003 (aged 77); Mosdós, Hungary
- Known for: drawing, printing, illustration, decoration

Endre László Szász (“Vallon”) (7 January 1926 – 18 August 2003) was a Hungarian painter, illustrator, graphic artist, printmaker, muralist, production designer and ceramics decorator (porcelain painter). He described himself as a Folk Surrealist.

== Early life ==
Endre's father, Béla Szász, was a doctor, and he seems to have inherited his artistic ability from his mother's (Erzsébet Susenka) family. He was a natural artist and drew from childhood. He used oil, acrylic, tempera, pencil, ink, charcoal, monotype, drypoint, lithography, etching and aquatint, and painted on several materials, like posters and porcelain. He also had several book illustrations.

Endre studied at the University of Fine Art in Budapest.

== Professional life ==
Between the late 1940s until the late 1960s, Szász worked as an illustrator. During this time, he illustrated a few hundred books. In 1959, he won an illustrator prize in the Leipzig Fair. In 1964 in Britain, he presented his works on Omar Khayyam's Rubaiyat. He had several exhibitions all over the world, including the Museum of Modern Art (Mexico City), Auschwitz Museum (Poland), the Hungarian National Gallery (Budapest), and also exhibited in Madrid, Copenhagen, Brussels, Berlin, Rome, Oslo, Johannesburg, New Orleans, Los Angeles, San Francisco, Budapest, Amman (Jordan) and Tokyo. A Szász original also hangs in La Sebastiana, one of the homes of the famous Chilean poet and diplomat Pablo Neruda. Szász owned a pet ocelot, as had Dali, though it is not certain this was in emulation.

Szász lived in Toronto, Canada 1970–1974, then in Los Angeles, California until 1982, when he went back to Hungary.
