= List of Rijksmuseums =

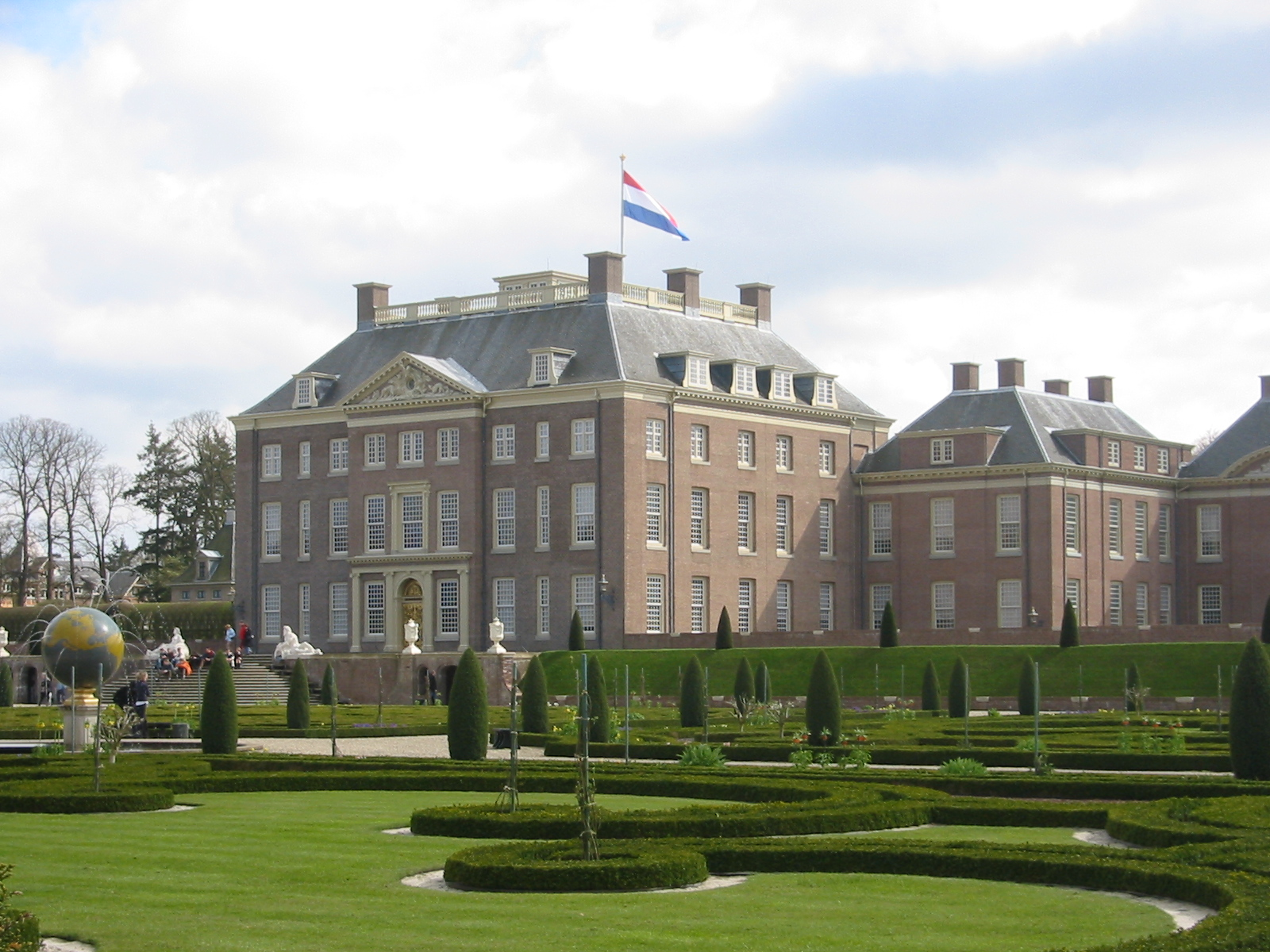
Palace Het Loo, national museum in Apeldoorn

Rijksmuseum (Dutch, 'state museum') is the general name for a national museum in the Dutch language. When only "Rijksmuseum" is used, it usually refers to the Rijksmuseum in Amsterdam.

Current and former Rijksmusea in the Netherlands include the following:

== Amsterdam ==
- Rijksmuseum
- Van Gogh Museum
- Het Scheepvaartmuseum
- Rijksprentenkabinet

== Apeldoorn ==
- Paleis het Loo National Museum

== Arnhem ==
- Netherlands Open Air Museum

== Doorn ==
- Huis Doorn

== Dordrecht ==
- Dordrechts Museum

== Enkhuizen ==
- Rijksmuseum het Zuiderzeemuseum

== Enschede ==
- Rijksmuseum Twenthe

== Leiden ==
- Rijksmuseum voor Volkenkunde
- Rijksmuseum van Oudheden
- Museum Boerhaave
- Naturalis Biodiversity Center

== Muiden ==
- Rijksmuseum Muiderslot

== Otterlo ==
- Kröller-Müller Museum

== Poederoijen ==
- Slot Loevestein

== The Hague ==
- Rijksmuseum Meermanno

== Utrecht ==
- Museum Catharijneconvent

== See also ==
- Swedish Museum of Natural History (Naturhistoriska riksmuseet)
