= Tsvetkov =

Tsvetkov is a surname. Notable people with the surname include:

- Aleksandar Tsvetkov (born 1990), Bulgarian footballer, plays as a midfielder
- Alexander Tsvetkov (1914–1990), a Bulgarian chess master
- Alexei Tsvetkov (1924–2009), Russian sculptor (animal painter)
- Alexei Tsvetkov (poet) (1947–2022), Russian poet and essayist
- Alexei Tsvetkov (ice hockey) (born 1981), Russian professional ice hockey forward
- Borislav Tsvetkov (born 1967), Bulgarian sprint canoeist who competed in the late 1980s
- Dmitri Tsvetkov (1890–1930), Votic teacher and linguist
- Dmitriy Tsvetkov (born 1983), Russian orienteering competitor and European champion
- Ivan Tsvetkov (born 1979), Bulgarian footballer, plays as a forward
- Mikhail Tsvetkov (born 1980), Russian high jumper
- Milen Tsvetkov (born 1966), Bulgarian journalist and TV host
- Nikolai Tsvetkov (born 1960), Russian oligarch, the founder and president of Nikoil Financial
- Nikolay Tsvetkov (born 1986), Bulgarian footballer, plays as a midfielder
- Pavel Tsvetkov (born 1971), Bulgarian poet and writer
- Sergey Tsvetkov (born 1964), Russian historian
- Valeri Tsvetkov (born 1977), retired Russian professional footballer

== See also ==
- Chavdar Tsvetkov Stadium, multi-use stadium in Svoge, Bulgaria
- Dragan Tsvetkov Boulevard, large boulevard in Bulgaria's capital Sofia
- Tsvety
- Tsvitkove
