= Dmitry Vinogradov =

Russian inventor (1720–1758)

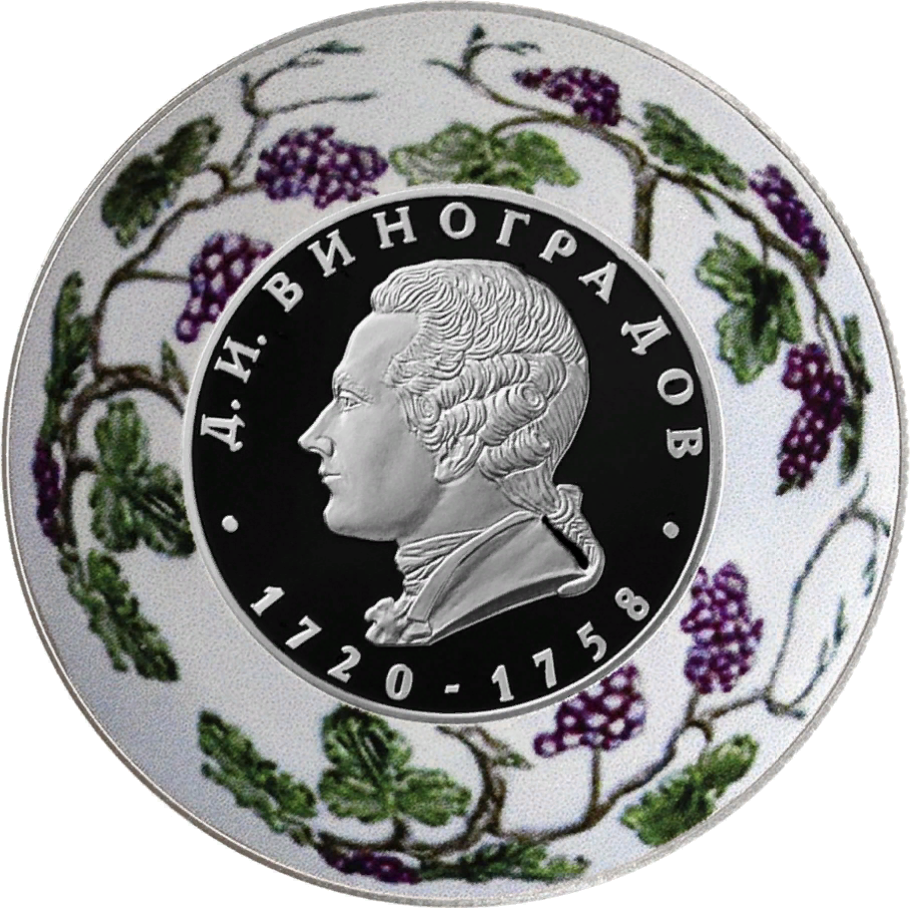
Vinogradov on a Russian commemorative coin

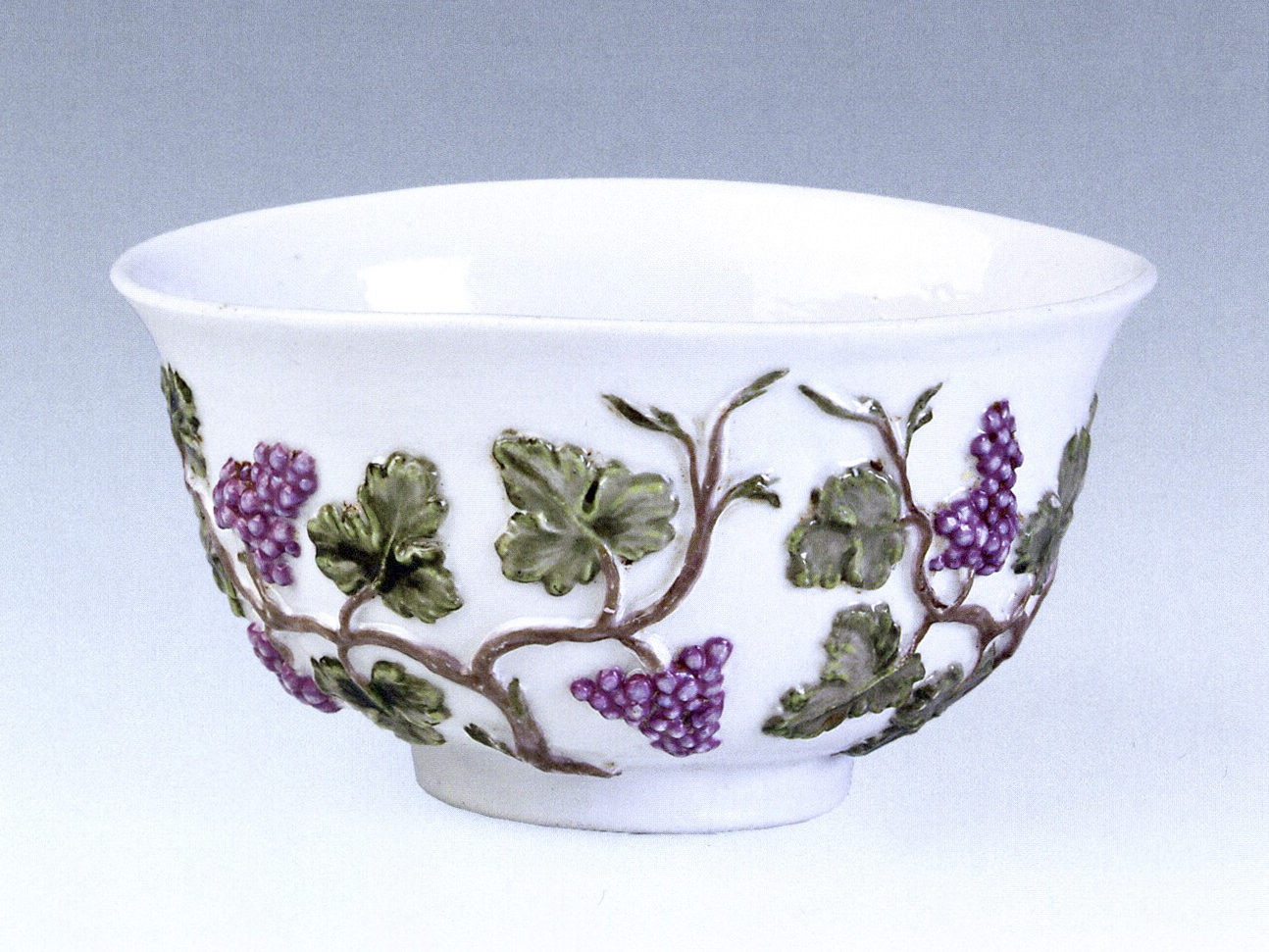
A cup made by Vinogradov in 1749

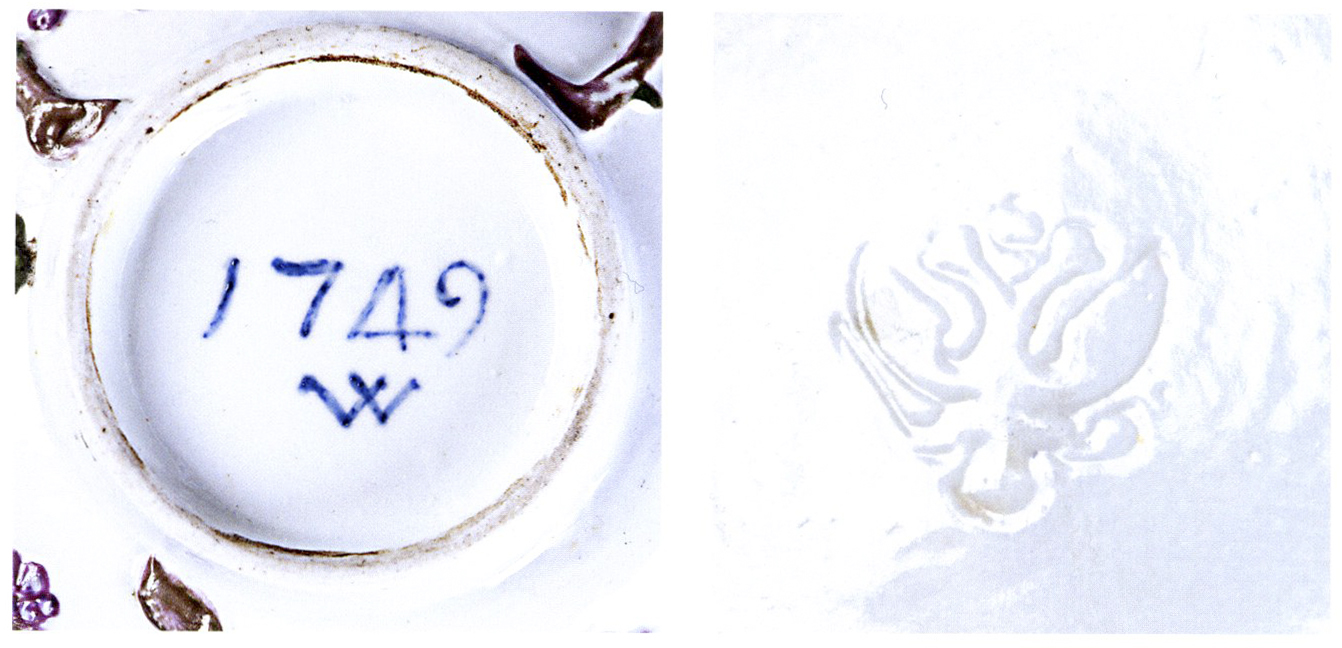
Vinogradov's seals

Dmitry Ivanovich Vinogradov (Russian: Дмитрий Иванович Виноградов; c. 1720 – 5 September [O.S. 25 August] 1758) was a Russian chemist who developed Russian hard-paste porcelain; he was the founder of the Imperial Porcelain Factory.

Vinogradov was born into a low-income household in Suzdal and was trained at the Slavic Greek Latin Academy where he came to know Mikhail Lomonosov. In 1736, Lomonosov, Vinogradov and a third student from the St. Petersburg Academy of Sciences, Gustav Ulrich Raiser, went abroad to study chemistry, metallurgy, and mining under Christian Wolff in Marburg, Hesse, and Johann Friedrich Henckel (Chemist) in Freiberg, Saxony. Upon his return to Russia in 1744, Vinogradov was sent to a ceramics manufactory that was established that year under the direction of Christoph Conrad Hunger, who had been induced by Empress Elizabeth to come to St Petersburg from Stockholm.

At that time hard-paste porcelain was produced only in China and Japan and in Meissen, Saxony, where a deposit of suitable kaolin had been discovered and first successfully employed in 1709 (see Meissen porcelain). Other European factories were beginning to emulate Meissen wares, but in soft-paste porcelain. The recipe for porcelain was a closely guarded secret at Meissen and the price of Meissen porcelain might exceed the price of silver of equal weight.

Hunger proved to be unable to produce porcelain from the materials at hand and was dismissed in 1748, leaving the venture in the hands of Vinogradov. Eight years Vinogradov and Mikhail Lomonosov spent developing an original Russian recipe for porcelain. In 1752, Vinogradov published a treatise advertising his success in producing the first satisfactory samples of porcelain, made of Russian raw materials, employing clay from Gzhel) mixed with finely-ground Olonets quartz and alabaster. Vinogradov trained the first Russian master craftsmen of porcelain at the factory. The first products were small wares, cups, snuffboxes and their lids, cane heads, doorknobs, knife handles and the like.

The production of large items, like plates, was going to be essential if the manufactory was to produce more than small luxuries. In December 1756 Vinogradov completed the construction of a large furnace and made a successful first firing. As a mark of its impending success the venture was renamed the Imperial Porcelain Factory. The Imperial factory's greatest period of success was to come under the direction of Prince Alexander Vyazemsky, after Vinogradov's death (in St. Petersburg in 1758). The factory exists today, once again known as the Imperial Porcelain Factory.
