= IFZ =

IFZ may refer to:

- Imperial Porcelain Factory, Saint Petersburg (Imperatorskii Farforovyi Zavod), a producer of porcelain in Saint Petersburg, Russia
- Institut für Zeitgeschichte ("Institute of Contemporary History"), established in 1949 with purpose the analysis of contemporary German history
