= Judenporzellan =

Judenporzellan (literally "Jewish Porcelain") is a designation for inferior porcelain produced by the Royal Porcelain Factory owned by Frederick the Great in the late 18th century. To increase business, he decreed in 1769 that a tax on Jews in the form of coerced purchases from his factory would be levied on Jews in order to obtain marriage, death, business and other certificates and permits. Some accounts claim that the twenty porcelain monkeys belonging to the heirs of Moses Mendelssohn (1729–1786) are Judenporzellan (Hartmann 2006), although some authorities doubt the authenticity of these family stories based on chronology and provenance—at least one of the monkeys is of Meissen manufacture.

== Literature ==
- Elon, Amos. The Pity of It All: A Portrait of the German-Jewish Epoch (p 43) New York: Picador 2002.
- Hartmann, P.W. Das grosse Kunstlexikon accessed October 12, 2006
- Glueck, Grace Art in Review June 5, 1998 New York Times
- Todd, Larry Mendelssohn: A Life in Music 2003 Oxford U. Press
- Nayman Shira Awake in the Dark 2006 Scribner Leonard Lopate Show Oct 11, 2006 WNYC 12:13
