= Trude Petri =

German ceramicist (1906-1998)

Trude Petri-Raben
- Born: Trude Petri; August 25, 1906; Hamburg, Germany
- Died: February 5, 1998 (aged 91); Vancouver, Canada
- Known for: Ceramic design

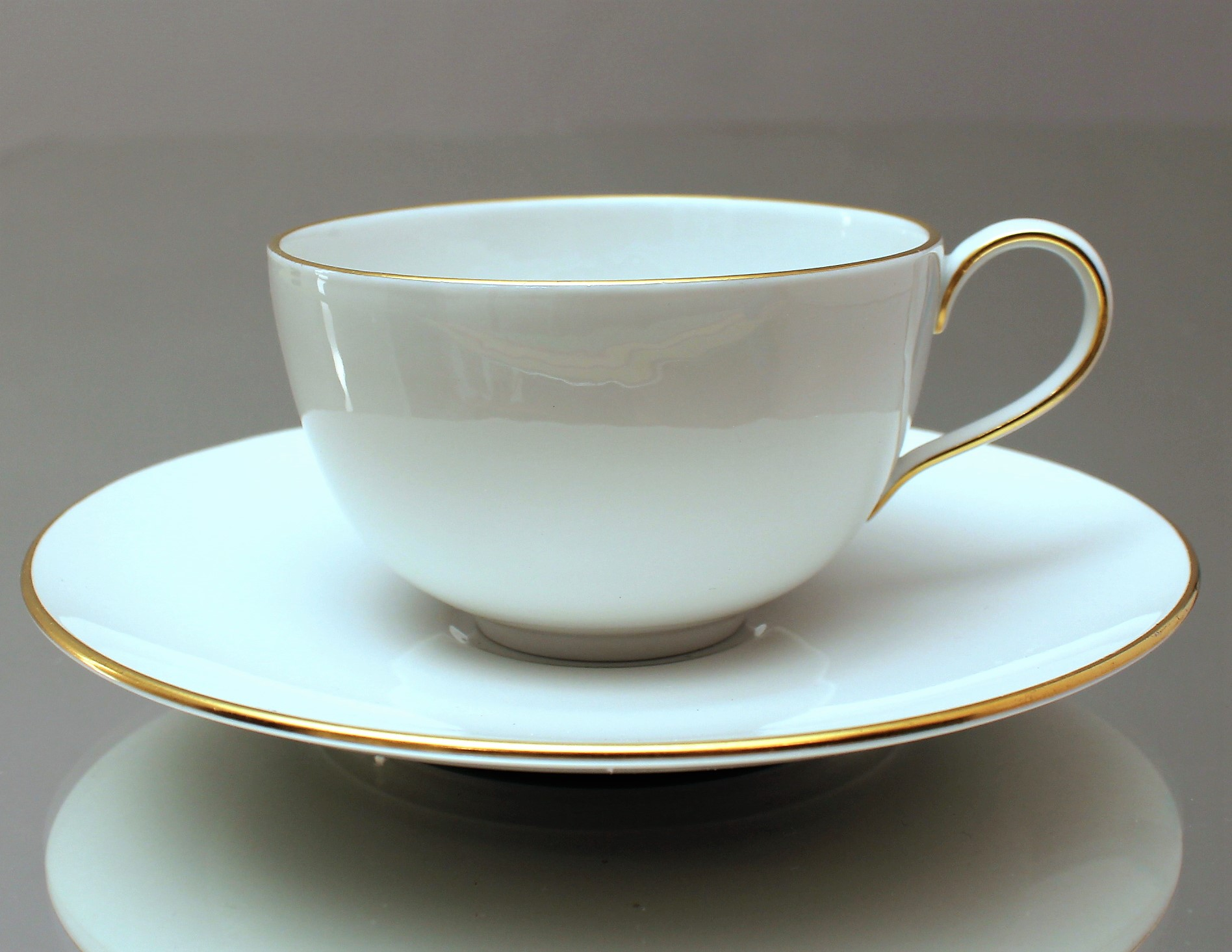
cup and saucer

Trude Petri (August 25, 1906 – February 5, 1998) was a German ceramicist, She is best known for her design work for the Royal Porcelain Factory, Berlin, specifically the 1930 Urbino series.

Petri was born on August 25, 1906, in Hamburg, Germany. She studied at the Hochschule für bildende Künste Hamburg and the Vereinigte Staatsschulen für freie und angewandte Kunst in Berlin. She worked for the Königliche Porzellan-Manufaktur (KPM) (Royal Porcelain Factory, Berlin). She produced the modernist tableware series, "Urbino", at KPM.

She died on February 5, 1998, in Vancouver, Canada.

Her work is in the Art Institute of Chicago, the British Museum, the Metropolitan Museum of Art, the Museum Boijmans Van Beuningen, the Museum of Modern Art, and the Victoria and Albert Museum.
