= Imperial Porcelain Factory, Saint Petersburg =

Russian porcelain manufacturer based in Saint Petersburg

Coordinates: 59°52′49″N 30°26′30″E

Imperial Porcelain Factory
- Native name: Императорский Фарфоровый Завод
- Formerly: Lomonosov Porcelain Factory
- Industry: Hand-painted ceramics manufacturing
- Founded: 1744; 282 years ago
- Founder: Dmitry Ivanovich Vinogradov
- Headquarters: Saint Petersburg, Russia
- Area served: International
- Owner: Nikolai Tsvetkov
- Website: ipm-jsc.com

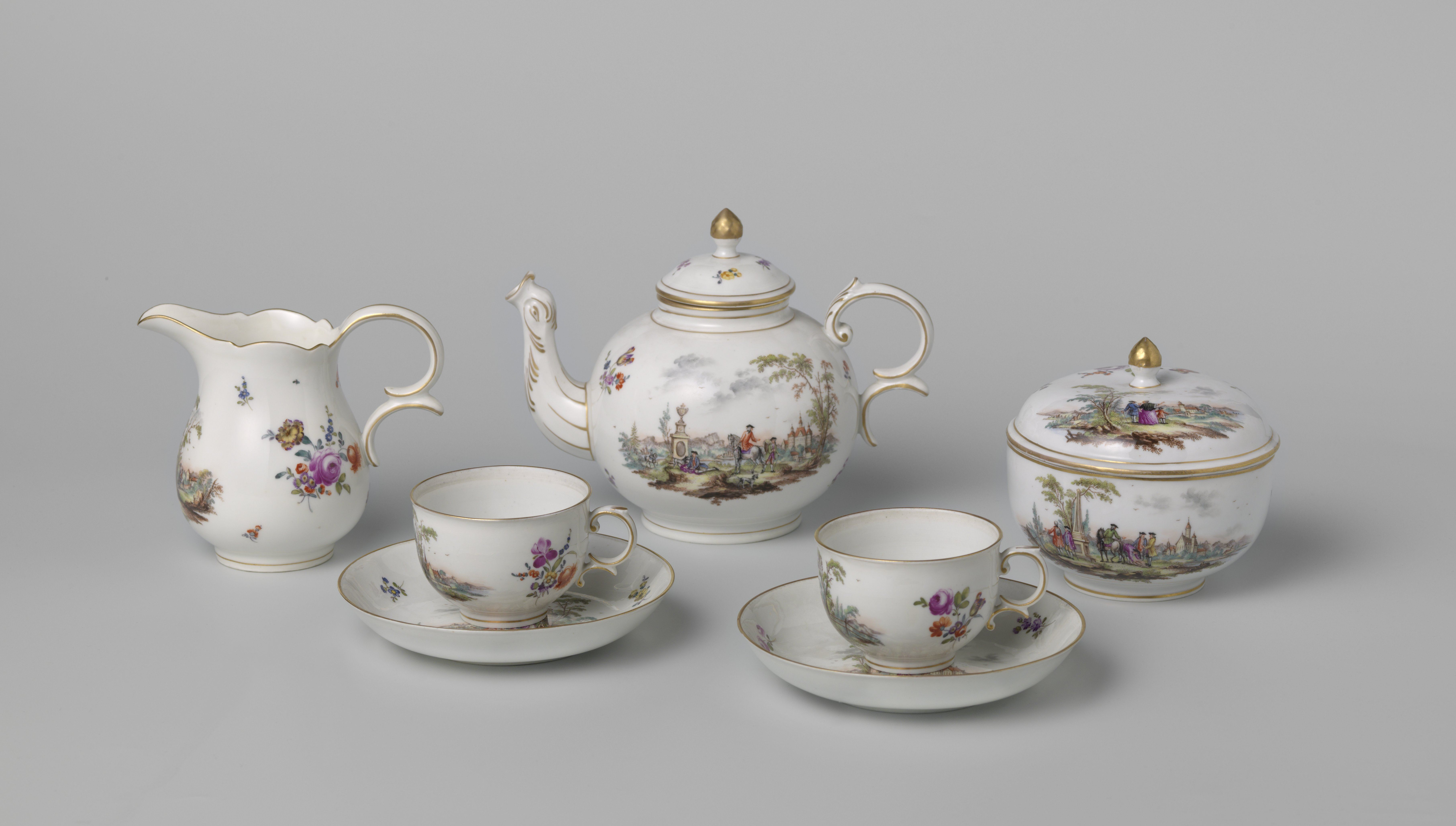
Tea service, c. 1765. Rijksmuseum

The Imperial Porcelain Factory (Russian: Императорский Фарфоровый Завод, romanized: Imperatorskii Farforovyi Zavod), also known as the Imperial Porcelain Manufactory (abbreviated as IPM), is a producer of hand-painted ceramics in Saint Petersburg, Russia. It was established by Dmitry Ivanovich Vinogradov in 1744 and was supported by the Russian tsars since Empress Elizabeth. Many still refer to the factory by its well-known former name during the Communist period, the Lomonosov Porcelain Factory.

== History ==
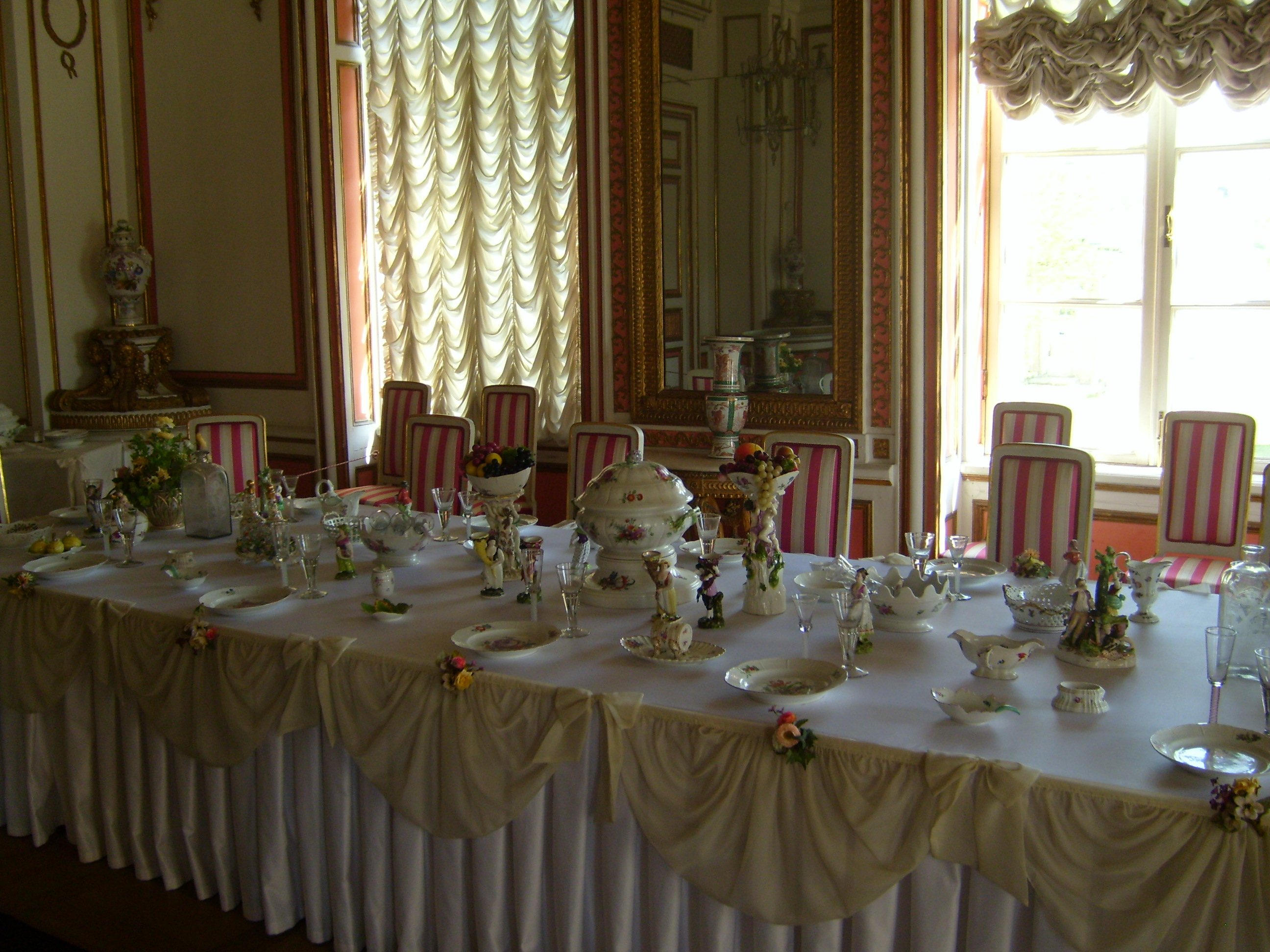
Russian porcelain in Kuskovo

=== 18th century ===
Attempts to develop the secret of hard-paste porcelain had been in progress in Russia since the visit of Peter the Great to Saxony in 1718; there, he saw Meissen porcelain at the Dresden court. Dmitry Ivanovich Vinogradov, a talented mining engineer who studied metallurgy at Freiberg, Saxony, developed the formula for the first porcelain manufacture in Russia, established in 1744 by order of Empress Elizabeth, daughter of Peter the Great, to "serve native trade and native art."

For a long time, the factory produced wares almost exclusively for the ruling Romanov family and the Russian imperial court, and for political and diplomatic gifts by them. Dinner services, often very large, were a staple, and from the 1780s, figures of Russian peasants and ethnic minorities of the Russian Empire taken from book illustrations. These last continued until the Revolution, and largely replaced the repertoire of pastoral, gallant, and commedia dell'arte figures familiar from factories in the rest of Europe. From the arrival of Neoclassical styles, the factory became known for large and ornate vases with painted scenes.

The Russian porcelain by Vinogradov had qualities similar to Meissen porcelain, while its formula (which consisted of only Russian ingredients) took its style from Chinese porcelain. At the beginning of the Vinogradov period, the motifs were monochrome and simplified; by the end of this period, developed miniatures were completed on porcelain. Gold leaf for gilding porcelain was prepared from gold coins from the Imperial Treasury.

‘The Golden Age of Catherine’ – the reign of Catherine the Great – was the age of prosperity for the fine Russian porcelain. In 1765, the manufactory was renamed the Imperial Porcelain Manufactory (IPM). From the very beginning of Catherine's reign, IPM was obliged to produce porcelain and also to bring profit. The Imperial Court's need for porcelain was large, and the permanent orders from the Court let IPM maintain the highest quality.

During the reign of Paul I (1796 to 1801), Russian porcelain continued to develop in style of Neoclassicism, with the increasing influence of Hellenic and Roman motifs.

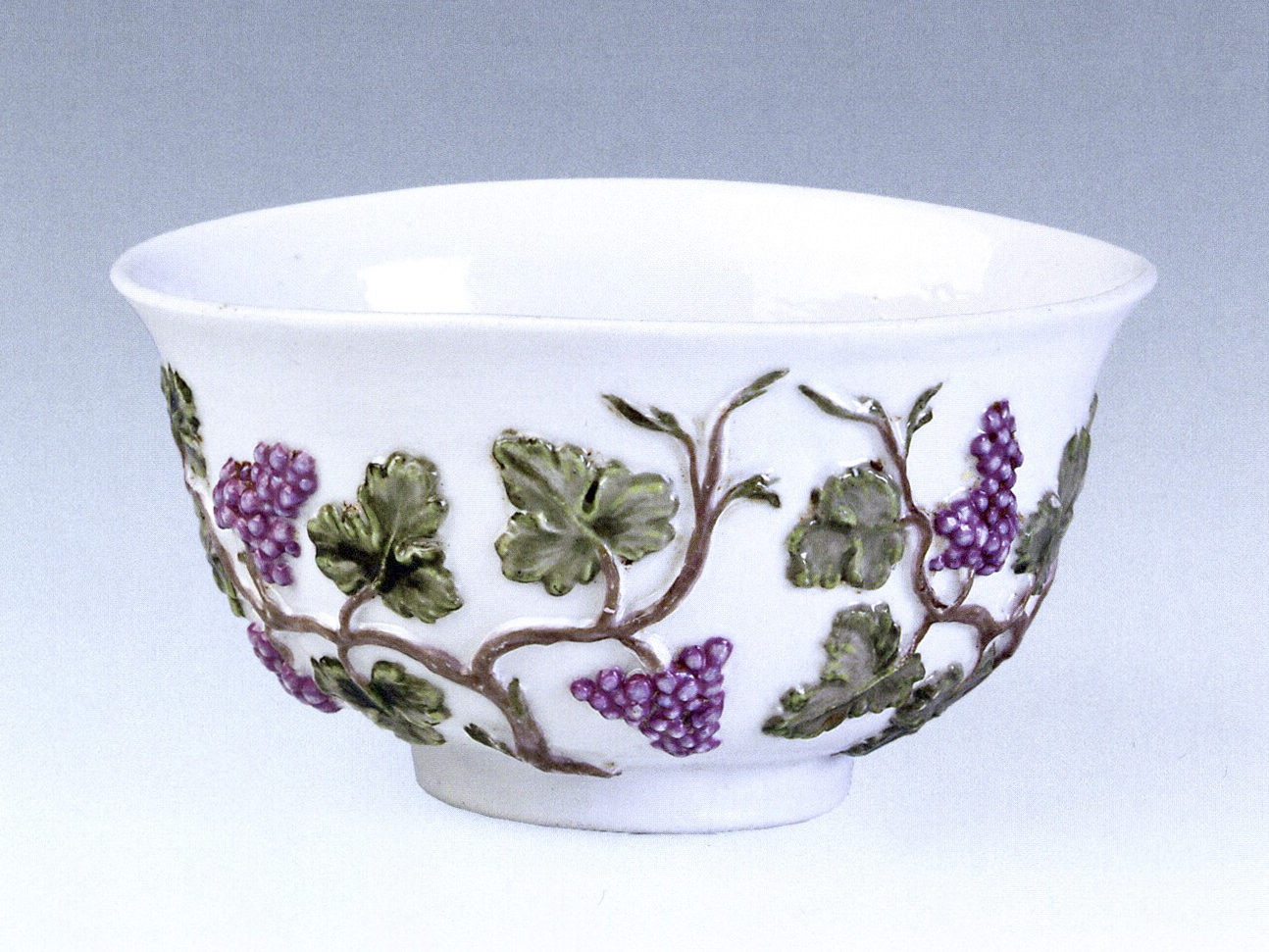
Very early bowl, dated 1749

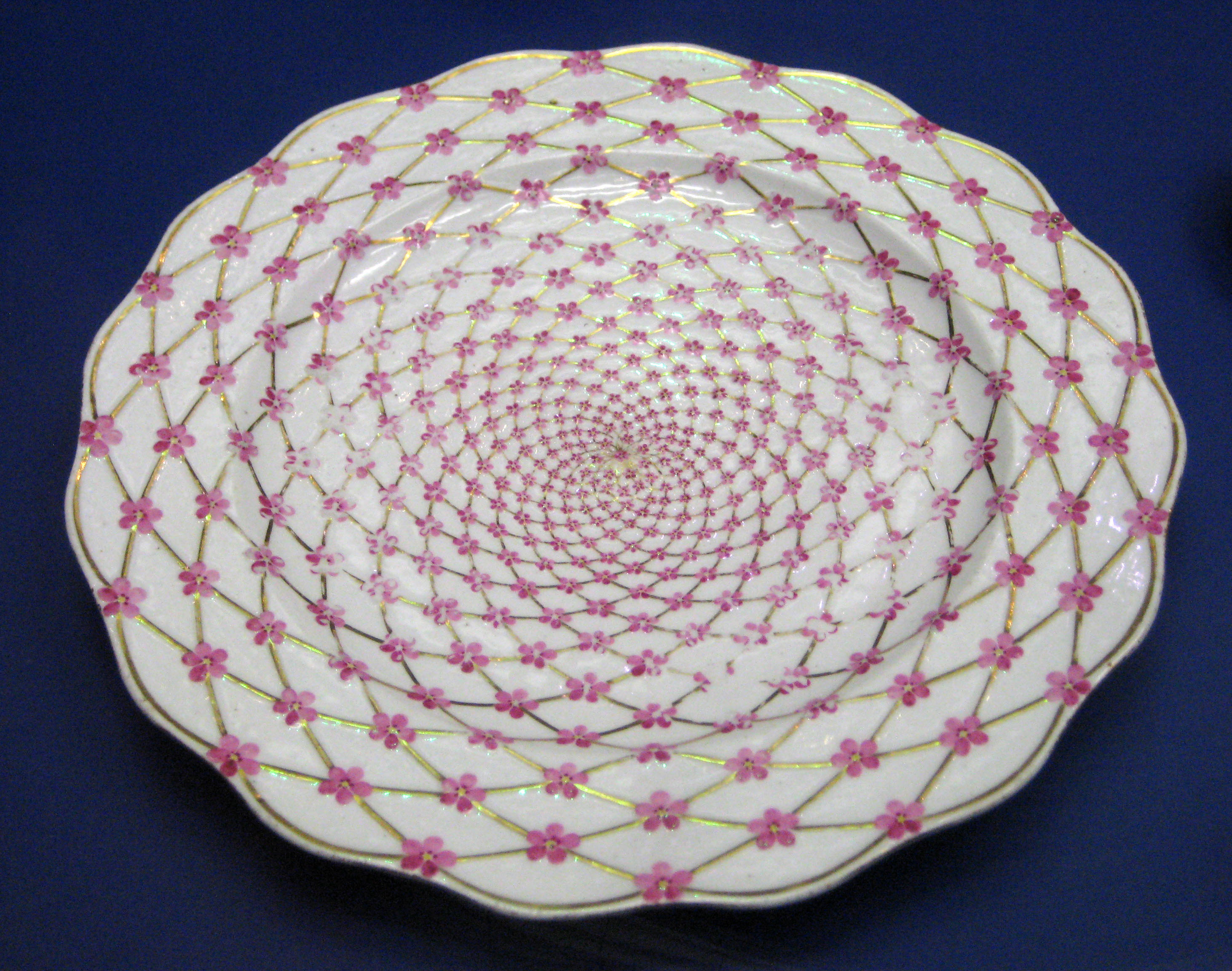
Plate from an Imperial service, 1756–62

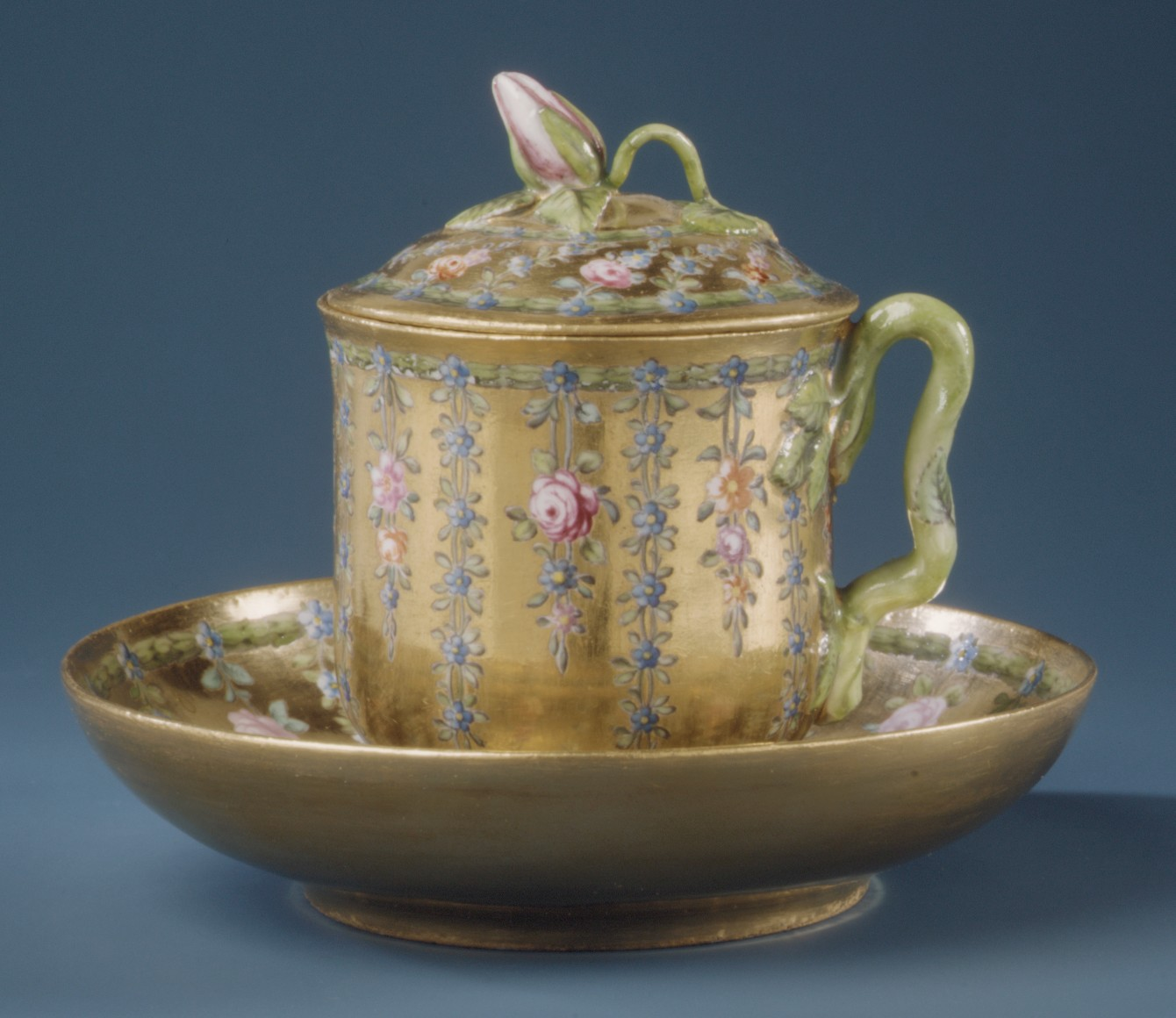
Cup with cover and saucer, c. 1760

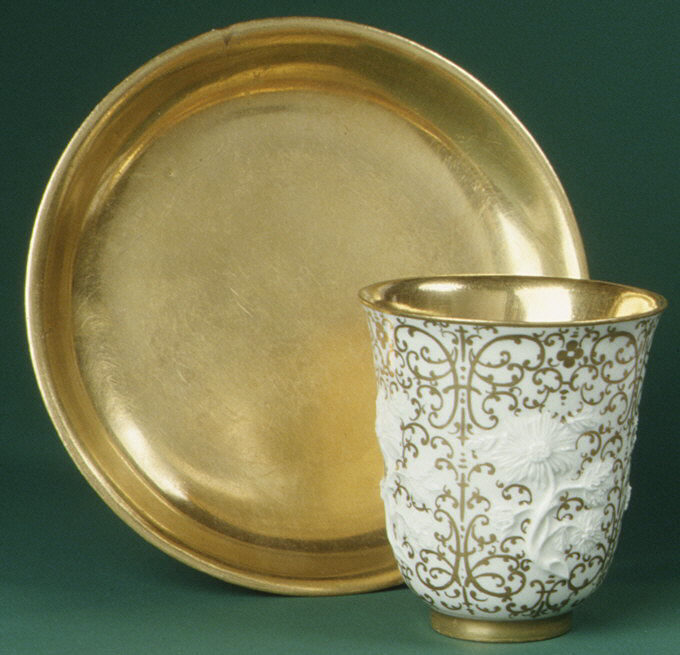
Beaker and saucer, c. 1775

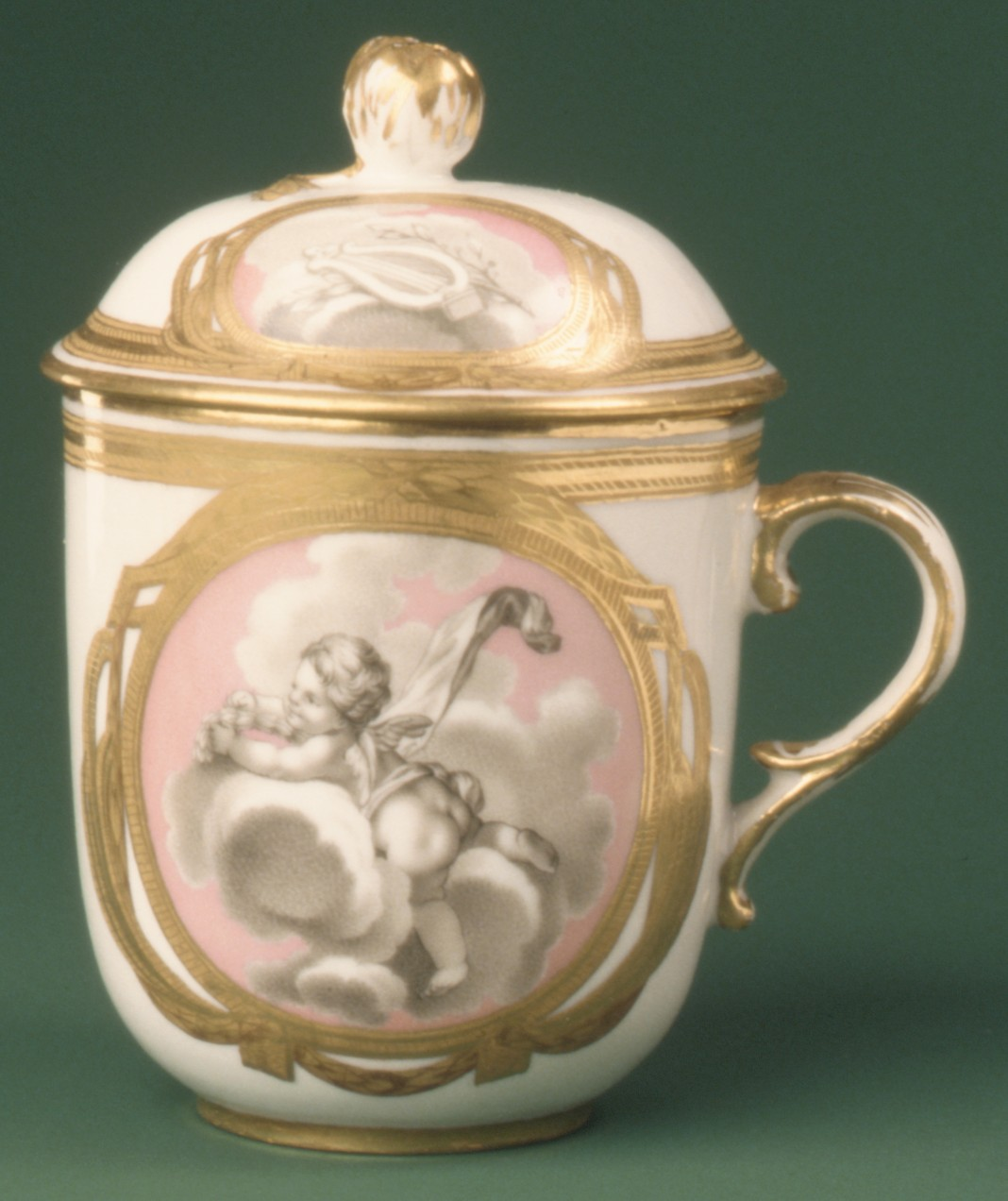
Cup with cover, from a tea service, c. 1775

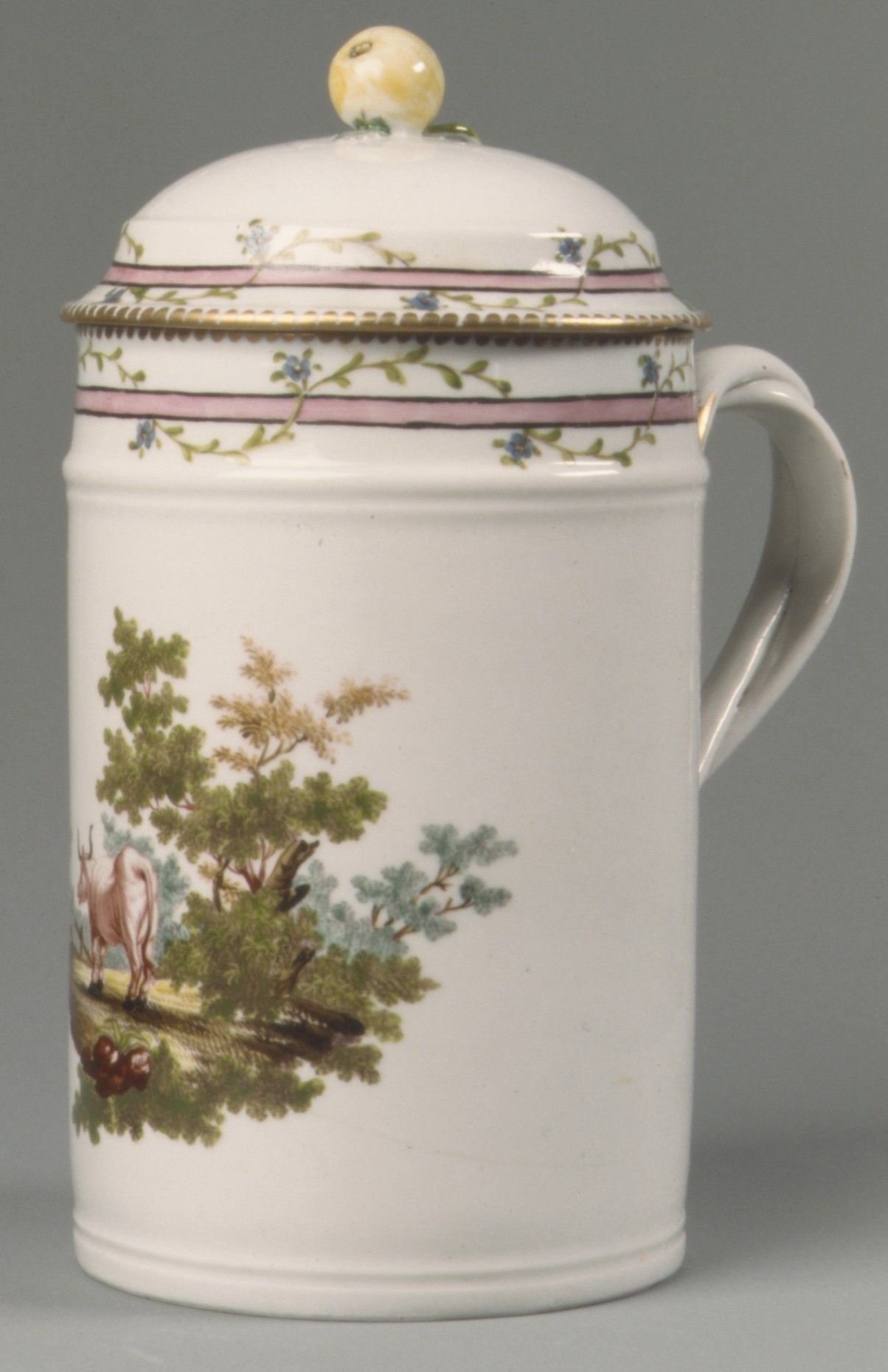
Tankard, c. 1780

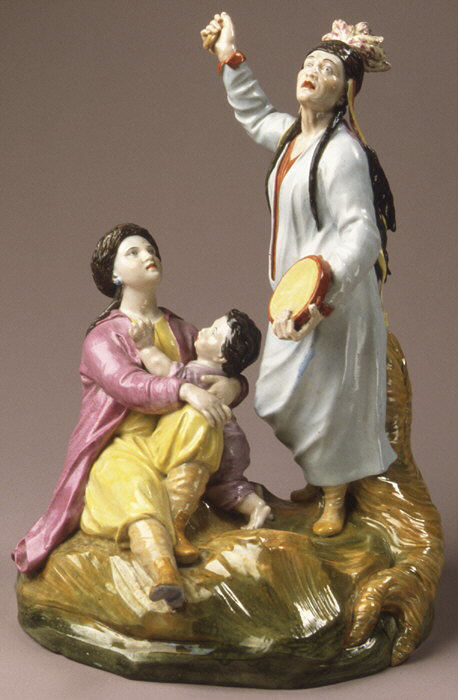
File:Female Shaman, c. 1780–1800

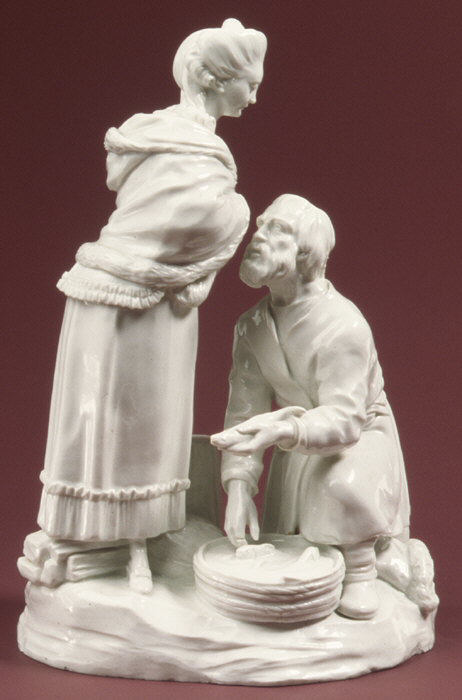
Fisherman, 1780–1800

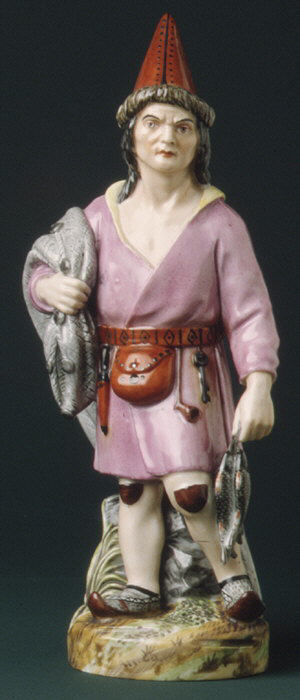
Lapplander, 1780–1800

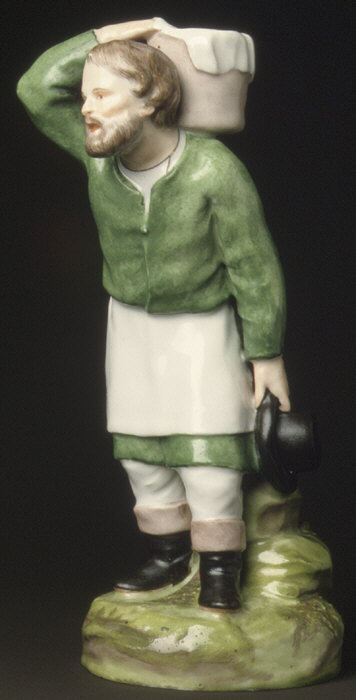
Ice Cream Seller, 1780–1800

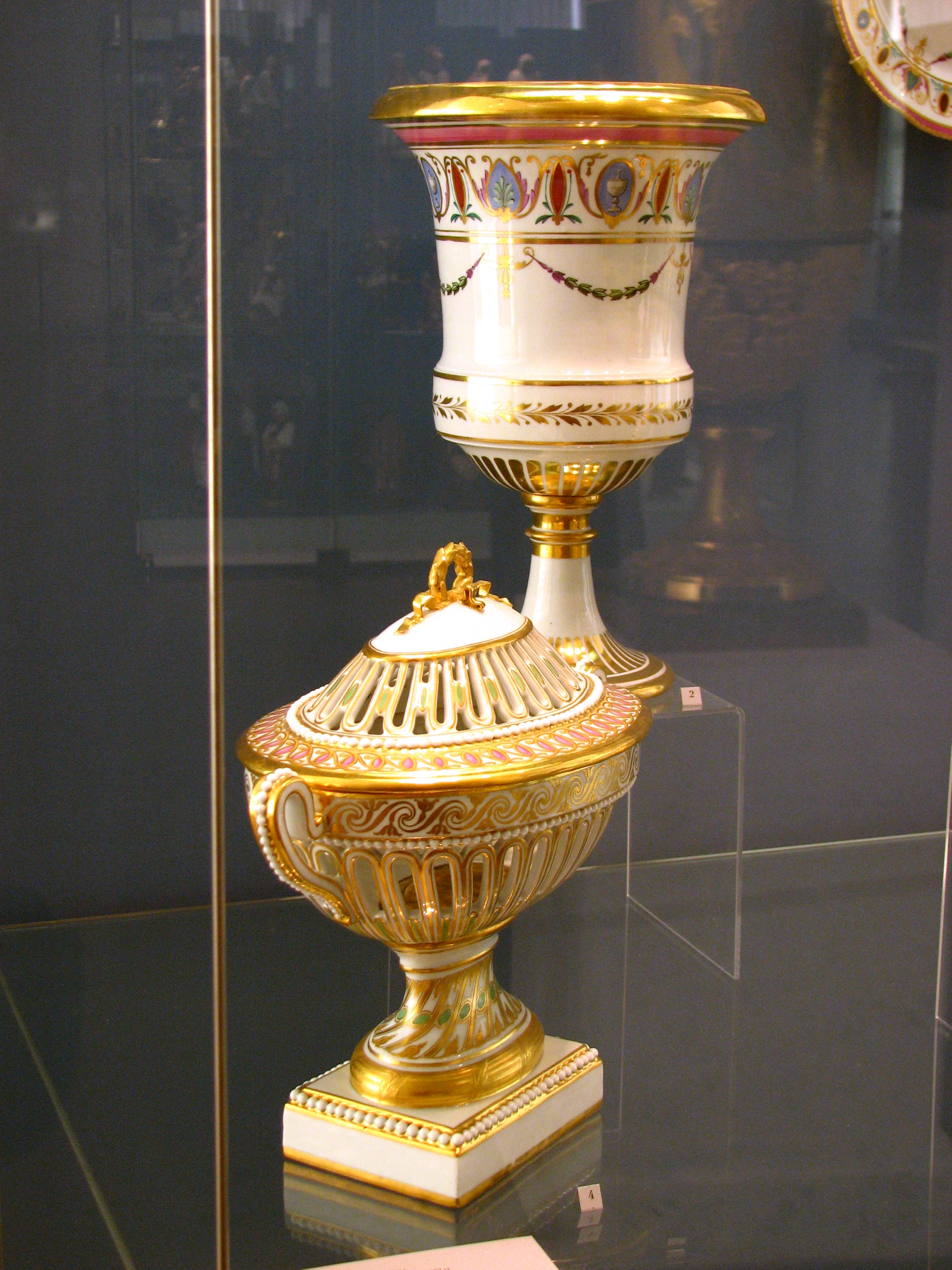
Vases, 1780–1800

=== 1801–1825 ===
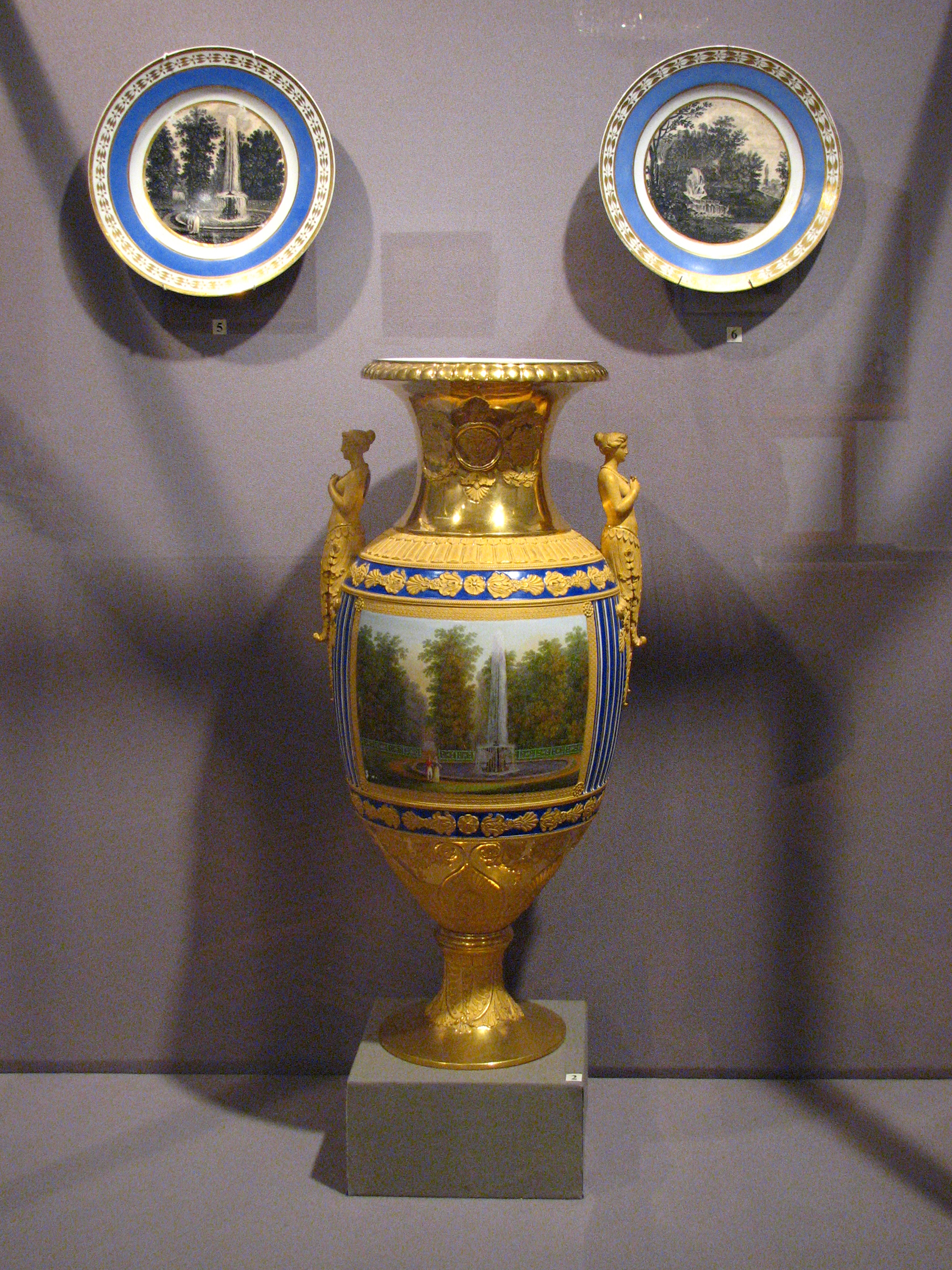
The works of the Imperial Porcelain Factory abound in the former residences of the Russian emperors, such as Peterhof and Tsarskoe Selo

Masters from the Royal Porcelain Factory, Berlin and porcelain painters from the Manufacture nationale de Sèvres were invited to Saint Petersburg, and the kiln chamber was restructured. In 1806, with the imposition of Napoleon's Continental Blockade, the import of porcelain to Russia was banned and competition between a variety of Russian private porcelain factories arose. The production line of IPM porcelain was divided into a department for producing expensive low-profit Royal presents and a department producing ordinary porcelain for consumers among the Russian nobility.

=== 1825–1894 ===
From the reign of Nicholas I (1825 to 1855), imported kaolin from Limoges began to be used. Porcelain plaques and large porcelain items of high perfection were made. A special method of durable fire gilding that could be burnished was invented, although subsequently lost.

Nicholas I took a personal part in the managing of IPM. The projects for porcelain items were handed in to him for his confirmation. The manufactory's own museum was established in 1844. Later on, a library was formed from books on art, paintings and engravings.

By the beginning of the reign of Alexander II (1855 to 1881), IPM worked only with imported raw materials. A year before the abolition of serfdom, the IPM workers had been given their freedom, but many of them continued to work at IPM. However, the number of the Imperial Court's orders decreased. The porcelain was produced mainly on old models. From the beginning of the 1870s, copying of famous paintings on porcelain ceased, and landscapes were rarely painted. Instead, purely ornamental decoration prevailed. IPM started to use coloured glazes and to decorate their porcelain with pâte-sur-pâte patterns.

The idea of closing down the ‘useless and unprofitable’ enterprise emerged in 1881. Later on, the idea transformed into the assignation of IPM to the Imperial Academy of Arts, but Alexander III, whose reign had just started, commanded the best possible conditions (from a technological and arts point of view) for IPM so that IPM could bear its name "Imperial" with dignity and set a standard for all private porcelain manufactory owners.

In 1889, the new formula was invented for the dark red sang-de-boeuf glaze. Since 1892, the underglaze decoration technology had been mastered with the help of Danish experts. The Russian emperor was married to a Danish princess and paid interest to the underglaze painting.

=== 1894–1917 ===
By the beginning of the 20th century, IPM had become one of the leading porcelain factories in Europe. IPM porcelain was famous for its exceptional quality. It was produced from body made of the highest quality ingredients on up-to-date equipment. This body was stored in cellars for 10 years before use in production.

The Art Nouveau style influenced the shapes of the porcelain. Porcelain was produced with whimsically curved forms decorated by stylized plants, mermaids and other Art Nouveau motifs. As a rule, the vases were covered by underglaze decor. Every vase had a unique form. The underglaze decoration made it possible for the artists to paint changeable seasons and winter landscapes.

IPM began to produce technical and chemical porcelain due to the end of imports of porcelain from Germany during World War I. The production of fine porcelain was decreased to a minimal level. All the fine porcelain items produced were sold at charity auctions benefitting the imperial hospitals. Only Easter eggs were produced in large quantities for Easter celebrations of soldiers.

=== Soviet period ===
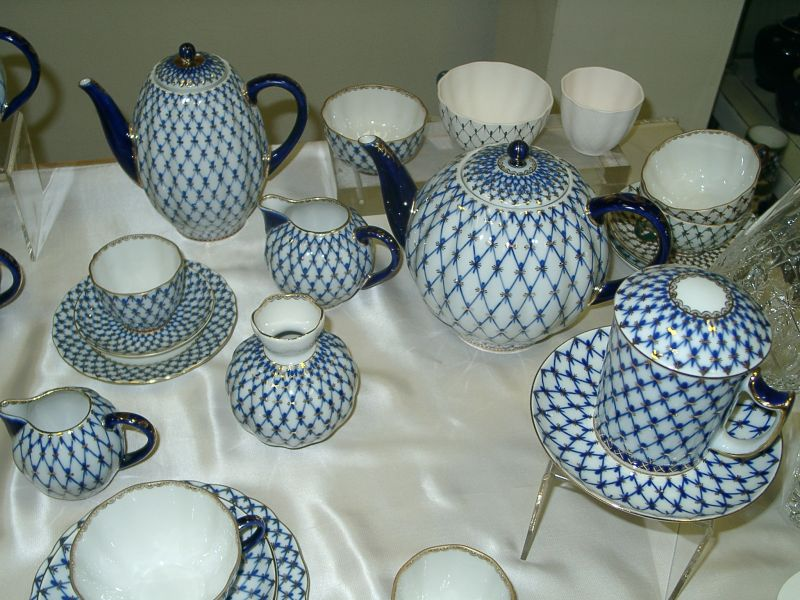
Cobalt net, the trademark style of the Imperial Porcelain Factory.

With the abolition of the Russian monarchy in 1917, the Imperial Porcelain Factory was renamed "State Porcelain Factory" (GFZ - Gossudarstvennyi Farforovyi Zavod) by the Bolshevik regime. During the early years of the Soviet Union, the GFZ produced so-called propaganda wares, ranging from plates to figurines of the Soviet elite.

In 1925, on the occasion of the 200th jubilee of the Russian Academy of Sciences, it was given the name of the academy's founder, Mikhail Lomonosov. It became known as the Leningrad Lomonosov Porcelain Factory (LFZ - Leningradski Farforovyi Zavod imeni M.V. Lomonosova). The newly christened Lomonosov factory produced a range of wares, including collectible animal figurines and dinner sets.

Its best-known pattern, cobalt net, first appeared in 1949. The design is based on a blue net pattern that was painted on raised lines cast into the porcelain dinnerware pieces of Catherine the Great. The factory has actual examples of Catherine's dinnerware with this design. The new design pattern is a combination of intersecting lines of cobalt blue with inverted tear drops of cobalt blue (made from mineral cobalt) and 22 karat gold accents. There is also a version that artist Anna Yatskevich, the author of the famous cobalt net, painted a set in memory of the cross-glued windows of houses and the cross-light of searchlights that illuminated the sky of besieged Leningrad. These crosses on the windows were used as a device reducing small vibrations because of strong blast wave.

=== Post-Soviet era ===
LFZ was privatized in 1993 as the "Lomonosov Porcelain Factory". At that time, wide exports began to countries unfamiliar with Lomonosov wares, particularly the United States and Japan. KKR and The U.S. Russia Investment Fund owned 51% until 1999, when the Russian government nationalized the company. In 2002, LFZ was sold to Nikolai Tsvetkov, President of Nikoil.

== Return to old name ==
On 29 May 2005, the stockholders of Lomonosov Porcelain Factory passed a resolution to return to their pre-Soviet name, the Imperial Porcelain Manufactory.

The IPM has recently started to produce hand-made copies of porcelain from the range of Imperial porcelain exhibited in the State Hermitage Museum collection. This range includes dinner sets, collectable plates und vases from famous series and other porcelain items from the assortment of porcelain made here since the foundation of the manufactory in 1744.

== Post-Soviet backstamps ==
The first post-Soviet export backstamp was a red LFZ monogram, with "Made in Russia" stamped in red. After 2002, a new export backstamp appeared which featured a red or blue LFZ monogram along with the words "Hand Decorated, 1744, St. Petersburg, Russia". The post-2005 pieces are stamped "Imperial Porcelain, 1744, St. Petersburg", along with the double-headed imperial eagle.

Post-2005 IFZ backstamp

== See also ==
- Porcelain manufacturing companies in Europe
- Fine Art of Leningrad

== Notes ==
- "Russian Imperial Manufactory 1744-1904" Baron Von Wolf
