= Gzhel (rural locality) =

Gzhel (Russian: Гжель) is the name of several rural localities in Russia:

- Gzhel (selo), Moscow Oblast, a selo in Gzhelskoye Rural Settlement of Ramensky District in Moscow Oblast; 55°36′N 38°24′E
- Gzhel (settlement), Moscow Oblast, a settlement in Gzhelskoye Rural Settlement of Ramensky District in Moscow Oblast; 55°37′N 38°26′E
- Gzhel, Smolensk Oblast, a village in Bogdanovshchinskoye Rural Settlement of Safonovsky District in Smolensk Oblast
