= Sergey Tsvetkov =

Russian historian and lecturer

Sergey Eduardovich Tsvetkov (Russian: Цветков, Сергей Эдуардович) is a Russian historian, historical popular science writer and lecturer at the International University in Moscow. Since 2016, he is with the Russian Institute for Strategic Studies.

He graduated from the Moscow Oblast Pedagogical Institute, now Moscow State Oblast University

His largest work is the multi-volume Russian History ("Русская история"), where he rejects the Normanism theory of the origins of Russia and puts forth original theories of the term "Rus" and ethnic origins of the Russian people.

== Books ==
=== Russian History series ===
- Цветков С. Э. Русская история: книга первая. — М.: Центрполиграф, 2003.
- Цветков С. Э. Русская история: книга вторая. — М.: Центрполиграф, 2004.
- Цветков С. Э. Русская история: книга третья. — М.: Центрполиграф, 2006.
- Цветков С. Э. Древняя Русь. Эпоха междоусобиц. 1054 - 1212. — М.: Центрполиграф, 2009.

Corrected and expanded re-editions of the volumes

- Цветков С. Э. Начало русской истории. С древнейших времен до княжения Олега. М.: Центрполиграф, 2012.
- Цветков С. Э. Русская земля. Между язычеством и христианством. От князя Игоря до сына его Святослава. М.: Центрполиграф, 2012.
- Цветков С. Э. Эпоха единства Древней Руси. От Владимира Святого до Ярослава Мудрого. М.: Центрполиграф, 2012.
- Цветков С. Э. Древняя Русь: Эпоха междоусобиц. От Ярославичей до Всеволода Большое Гнездо. М.: Центрполиграф, 2013.

=== Other ===
- Цветков С. Э. Александр Первый, 1777—1825. — М.: Центрполиграф, 2005. — 589 с.
- Цветков С. Э. Александр Суворов, 1730—1800: Беллетриз. биогр. — М.: Центрполиграф, 1999. — 503 с.
- Цветков С. Э. Иван Грозный, 1530—1584: Беллетриз. биогр. — М.: Центрполиграф, 2000. — 586 c.
- Цветков С. Э. Петр I, 1672—1725: Беллетриз. биогр. — М.: Центрполиграф, 2000. — 583 с.
- Цветков С. Э. Царевич Дмитрий. Сын Грозного, 1582—1606. Марина Мнишек. — М.: Центрполиграф, 2005. — 444 c.
- Цветков С. Э. Карл XII. Последний викинг. 1682—1718. — М.: Центрполиграф, 2005. — 476 с.
- Цветков С. Э. Великое неизвестное. Magnum ignotum: Книги и судьбы. Забытые истории: Ист. миниатюры. — М.: Центрполиграф, 2002. — 508 c.
- Цветков С. Э. Узники Бастилии: 1369—1789 гг. — М.: Армада-Пресс, 2001. — 310 с.
- Цветков С. Э. Узники Тауэра: История замка. — М.: Армада-Пресс, 2001. — 380 c.
- Дороги, объединяющие столицы: [альбом]. — М.: А2-А4, 2008. В соавторстве с С.Г.Антоненко (предисловие и вводные тексты к главам).
- Сергей Цветков. Эпизоды истории в привычках, слабостях и пороках великих и знаменитых. — Аст, Астрель, ВКТ, 2011. — 448 с.
- Сергей Цветков. Последняя война Российской империи. — М.: Редакционно-издательский центр «Классика», 2016. — 496 с., ил.
- Сергей Цветков. Карлик Петра Великого: сб. исторических очерков и рассказов. М.: Политкнига, 2016.
- Сергей Цветков. Викинг. Исторический путеводитель по эпохе князя Владимира. М.: Эксмо, 2016.
- Сергей Цветков. Князь Владимир — создатель единой Руси. М.: Эксмо, 2017.
