= Nikolai Tsvetkov =

Russian oligarch (born 1960)

- Николай Цветков
- Born: May 12, 1960 (age 65); Novobrattsevsky settlement, Moscow Oblast, Soviet Union
- Education: Air Force Academy of Engineering (1988)
- Occupation(s): Entrepreneur, businessman
- Spouse: Galina Tsvetkova

Nikolai Tsvetkov (Russian: Николай Цветков; born May 12, 1960) is a Russian oligarch, the founder and president of Nikoil Financial, Chairman of the Board of Directors of FC Uralsib. As of 2009, with a wealth of $1.8 billion, he was the world's 397th-richest person.

Nikolay was born in Novobrattsevsky settlement, Moscow Oblast. He is a graduate of the Zhukovsky Air Force Engineering Academy in 1988. As an army officer, he served in Tambov, Moscow, and Russia's far east and fought in Afghanistan. Tsvetkov attained the rank of lieutenant colonel, before he retired, founding the brokerage firm Brokinvest. His obscure company became the investment and financial adviser to Lukoil (then a state-controlled concern) by offering a co-ownership to its president Vagit Alekperov, and profited immensely from the voucher privatization scheme of Russia's state-owned companies in the mid-1990s.

In 2002 he bought shares of the Imperial Porcelain Factory for his wife. In the same year he acquired Deshoulieres porcelain manufacturer in France.

Opened a chain of organic food stores "Bio-Market" (Russian: «Био-Маркет»).

== Charity ==
He owns the Victoria Charitable Foundation, which in 2014 completed the construction of the Victoria Children's Village in Armavir for orphaned children. The total cost of the project was 380 million rubles.

== Family ==
His wife is Galina Tsvetkova (a shareholder of the Lomonosov Porcelain Factory). Daughters Victoria and Julia.
