= Royal Porcelain Factory, Berlin =

German porcelain manufacturer

Coordinates: 52°30′54″N 13°20′00″E

KPM Königliche Porzellan-Manufaktur Berlin GmbH
- Type: Private (GmbH)
- Industry: Ceramic products
- Founded: 1763; 263 years ago
- Founder: Frederick the Great
- Headquarters: Berlin, Germany
- Products: European hard-paste porcelain
- Owner: Jörg Woltmann
- Number of employees: 150 (in 2013)
- Website: kpm-berlin.com

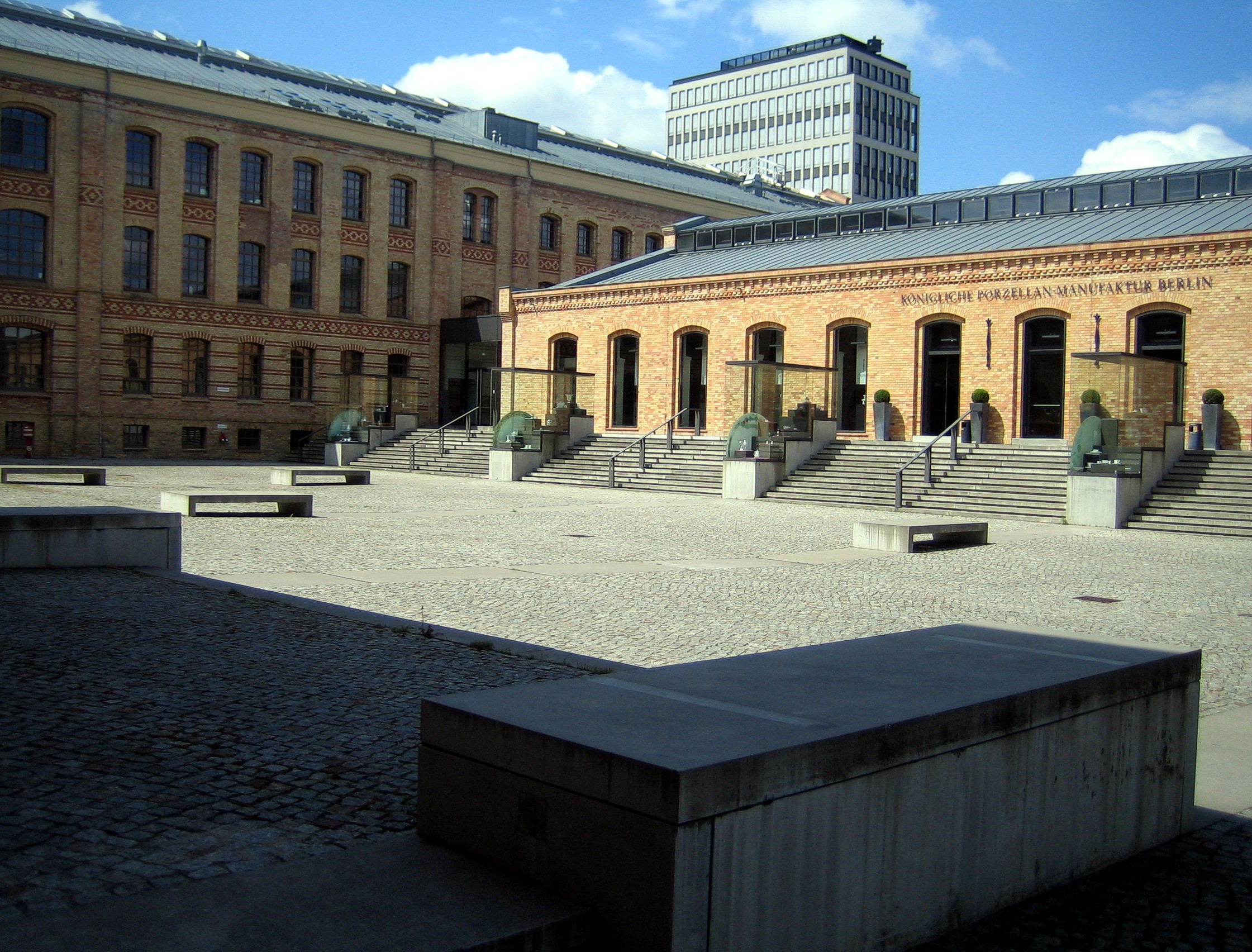
Exterior of the KPM building in 2009

The Royal Porcelain Factory in Berlin (German: Königliche Porzellan-Manufaktur, abbreviated as KPM), also known as the Royal Porcelain Manufactory Berlin and whose products are generally called Berlin porcelain, was founded in 1763 by King Frederick II of Prussia (known as Frederick the Great). Its actual origins, however, lie in three private enterprises which, under crown patronage, were trying to establish the production of "white gold" (i.e. porcelain) in Berlin from the mid-18th century onwards.

The company logo is a cobalt blue sceptre, which is stamped (painted prior to 1837) on every piece. All painted pieces produced by KPM are signed by the painter.

KPM has produced a number of dishware forms and porcelain figurines throughout its history. Some forms have hardly changed their shape in over 200 years of production. Frederick the Great, who, as the owner, jokingly referred to himself as his own "best customer", was under the spell of the Rococo style during his life; a culmination of this artistic style can be seen in his castles.

To this day, the most successful designs of the 1930s are the Urbino, Urania and Arkadia (originally a tea set designed in honor of KPM's 175th anniversary) created by Trude Petri. The Arkadia medallions were created by Siegmund Schütz and the Urania set (with the same basic form as the Arkadia) did not enter production until after the war, as was also the case with the Arkadia table set. Porcelain figurines of different styles corresponding to each era have always been created under the guidance of the master workshop, including the modern animal sculptures, such as the miniature Buddy Bear or Knut the Bear.

== History ==
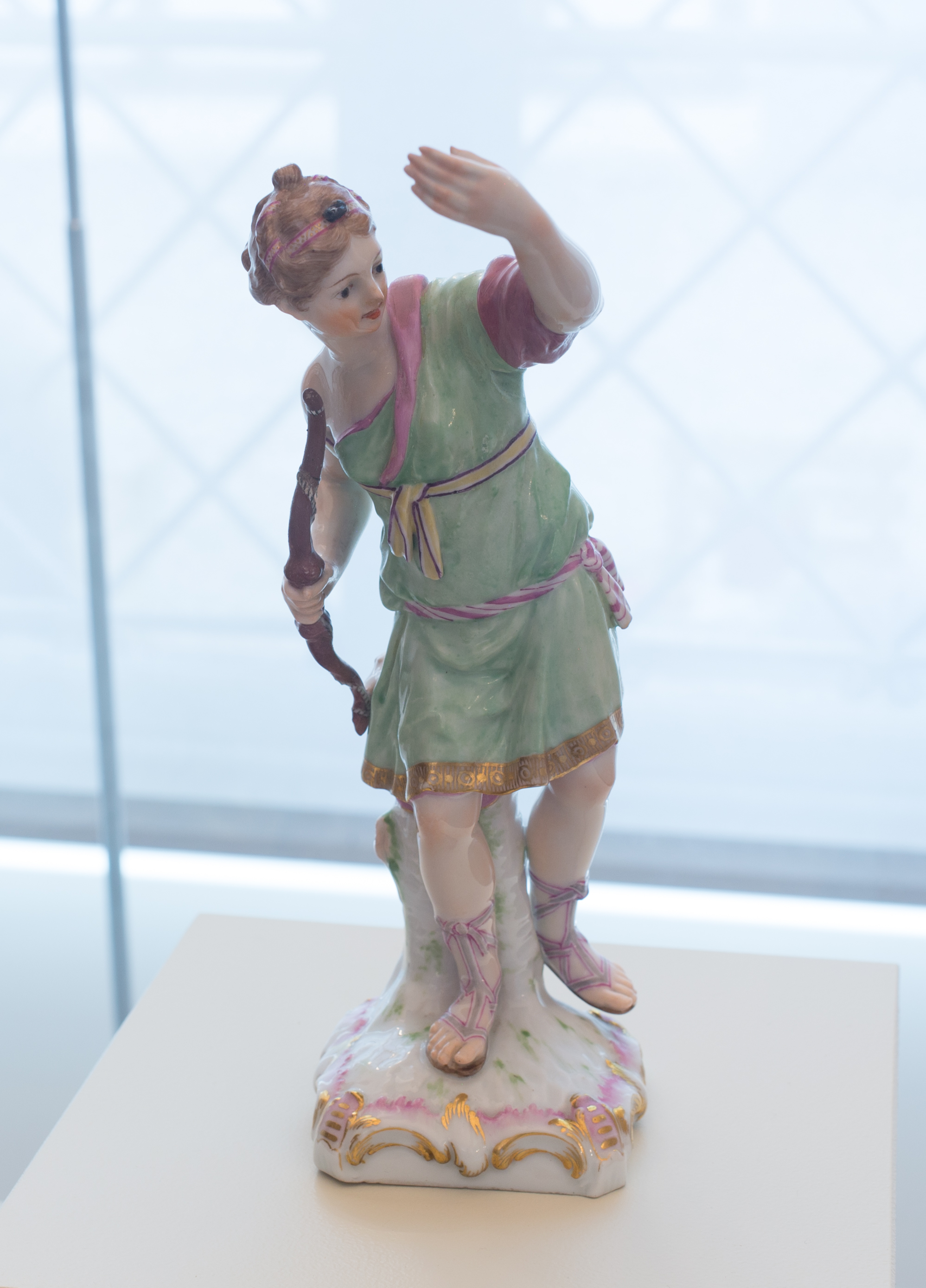
Diana figure, modelled by Wilhelm Christian Meyer, 1769

=== Beginnings ===
Before KPM was founded, two attempts had already been made to establish a porcelain manufactory in Berlin. In 1751, the Berlin wool manufacturer Wilhelm Caspar Wegely was granted the royal privilege to set up a porcelain manufactory in Berlin. Furthermore, Frederick II of Prussia granted him exemption from duties for the import of essential materials and assured him of the exclusion of all competition.

Wegely hired craftsmen from his competitors, and appointed the porcelain sculptor Ernst Heinrich Reichard to the post of chief modeller. However, technical difficulties and the Seven Years’ War between Prussia and Saxony soon proved to be the enterprise's downfall. In 1757, he dissolved his company and sold its inventories, equipment and materials to the Berlin businessman Johann Ernst Gotzkowsky.

In 1761, the second porcelain manufactory in Berlin started its operations. Gotzkowsky concluded an agreement with Wegely's chief modeller, Ernst Heinrich Reichard, who was in possession of the secret formula known as the arcanum. Reichard received 4,000 thaler for the arcanum, and another 3,000 for the stock of porcelain and other materials. Furthermore, he undertook to work for Gotzkowsky as a keeper of the arcanum and as the manager. Gotzkowsky also agreed to take over Reichard's eight workers.

Appreciated and supported by the King, Gotzkowsky managed to attract important artists and qualified employees. At the start, Gotzkowsky appointed Friedrich Elias Meyer, a pupil of Johann Joachim Kändler at the Meissen porcelain factory, Germany's leading porcelain maker, to the post of chief modeller, and Carl Wilhelm Boehme to the post of head of the porcelain-painting department. Gotzkowsky bought another building next to his own property at Leipziger Straße 4, and he began to build a manufactory on the site.

Nevertheless, Gotzkowsky's finances began to deteriorate. Since the royal exchequer was in the red on account of the war, Gotzkowsky believed that he stood little or no chance of obtaining assistance from the King. The end of the war also signalled the end for Gotzkowsky's manufactory. Today, the porcelain pieces from the early days marked with a W for Wegely and a G for Gotzkowsky are rare and collector's items.

=== Royal purchase ===
On 19 September 1763, Frederick II officially became the manufactory's new owner. He purchased the manufactory for the considerable sum of 225,000 thaler and took over the staff of 146 workers. He gave the business its name and allowed it to use the royal sceptre as its symbol. From then on, it was called the Königliche Porzellan-Manufaktur Berlin ("Royal Porcelain Manufactory Berlin") and became a model of how to run a business. There was no child labour, there were regular working hours, above-average incomes, secure pensions, a healthcare fund and assistance for widows and orphans.

=== Rococo ===
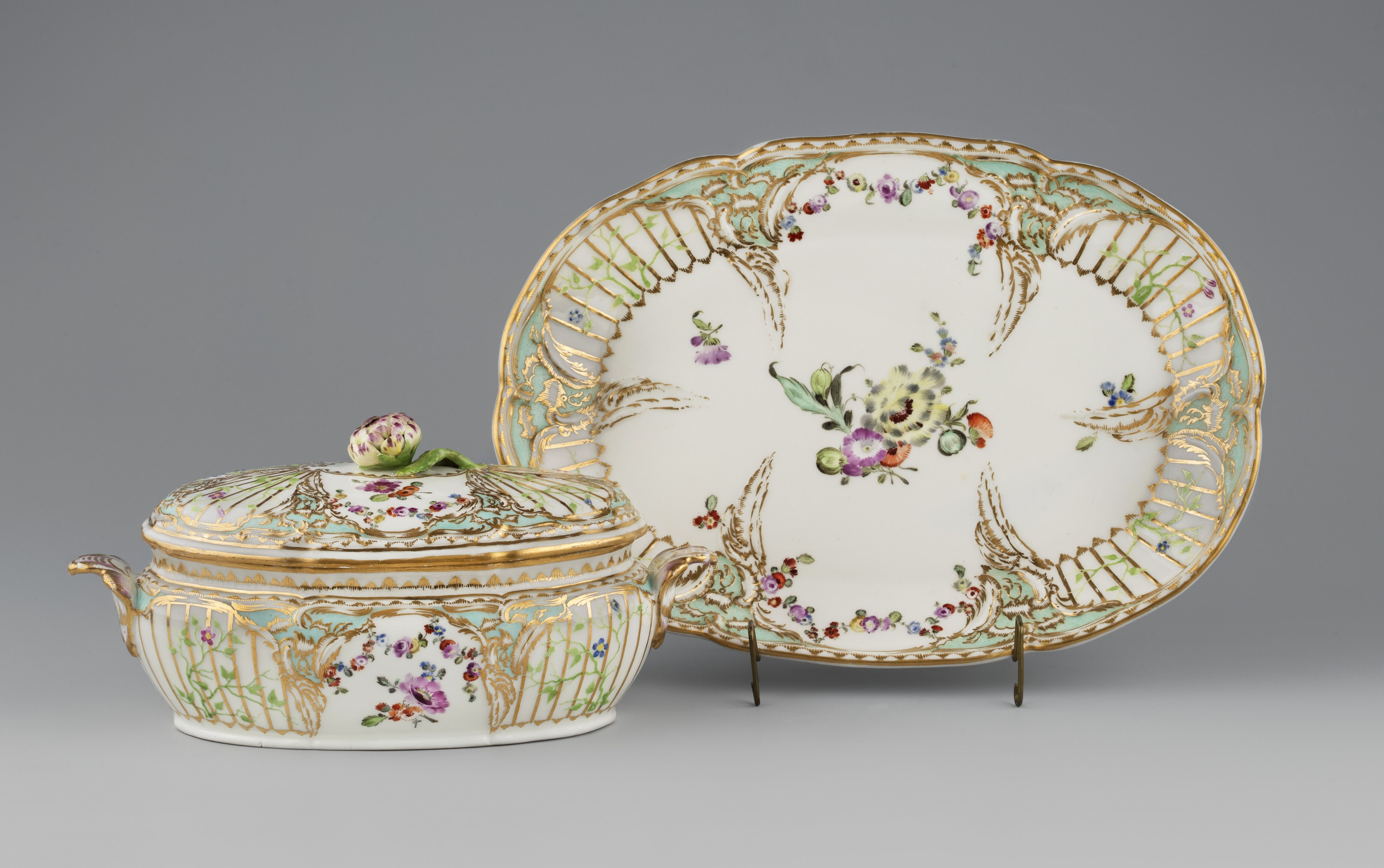
Tureen and Vase base with Reliefzierat decoration made for Frederick II on Neues Palais service (so-called 2. Potsdamsches), c. 1770–80. National Museum in Warsaw

The manufactory's most important client was Frederick the Great, who sometimes jokingly referred to himself as his "best customer". From 1765 to his death in 1786, Frederick II placed orders with KPM for porcelain to the value of 200,000 thaler. For his palaces alone, he ordered 21 dinner services, each of them with 36 place settings and up to 500 separate parts, complemented by elaborate table centrepieces. In addition, most of his diplomatic presents came from the manufactory, and they were to be found at the court of the tsars in Russia and on the tables of European aristocracy.

The factory was mainly known in this period for dinner services, with a fine white porcelain body with "a faint yellowish, slightly grey tinge". As would remain the case, the painting in overglaze enamel was of very high quality.

The services’ design and colouring was meticulously created to match the interior decoration of the rooms in which they were to be used. Frederick commissioned the first KPM table service in 1765 for the New Palace, Potsdam. The dinner service known as Reliefzierat (see illustration) was designed in the Rococo style by modelling master Friedrich Elias Meyer, who would later design many more services for the king. The ornamentation of the relief, made of gilded rocailles and flower espaliers, finds its counterpart in the stucco ceiling of the New Palace. The following years saw the appearance of the Neuzierat, Neuglatt, Neuosier and Antique Zierat (later named Rocaille) dinner services, which are still produced today.

In 1784, after a four-year development period, the King's desire for a soft and delicate shade of blue was fulfilled. The colour was known as Bleu mourant ("dying blue"), and it was used to decorate Neuzierat, Frederick's favourite dinner service. The colour was predominant in the King's private chambers at Sanssouci Palace and in the blue chamber of the New Palace in Potsdam, as well as in other castles.

=== Classicism ===
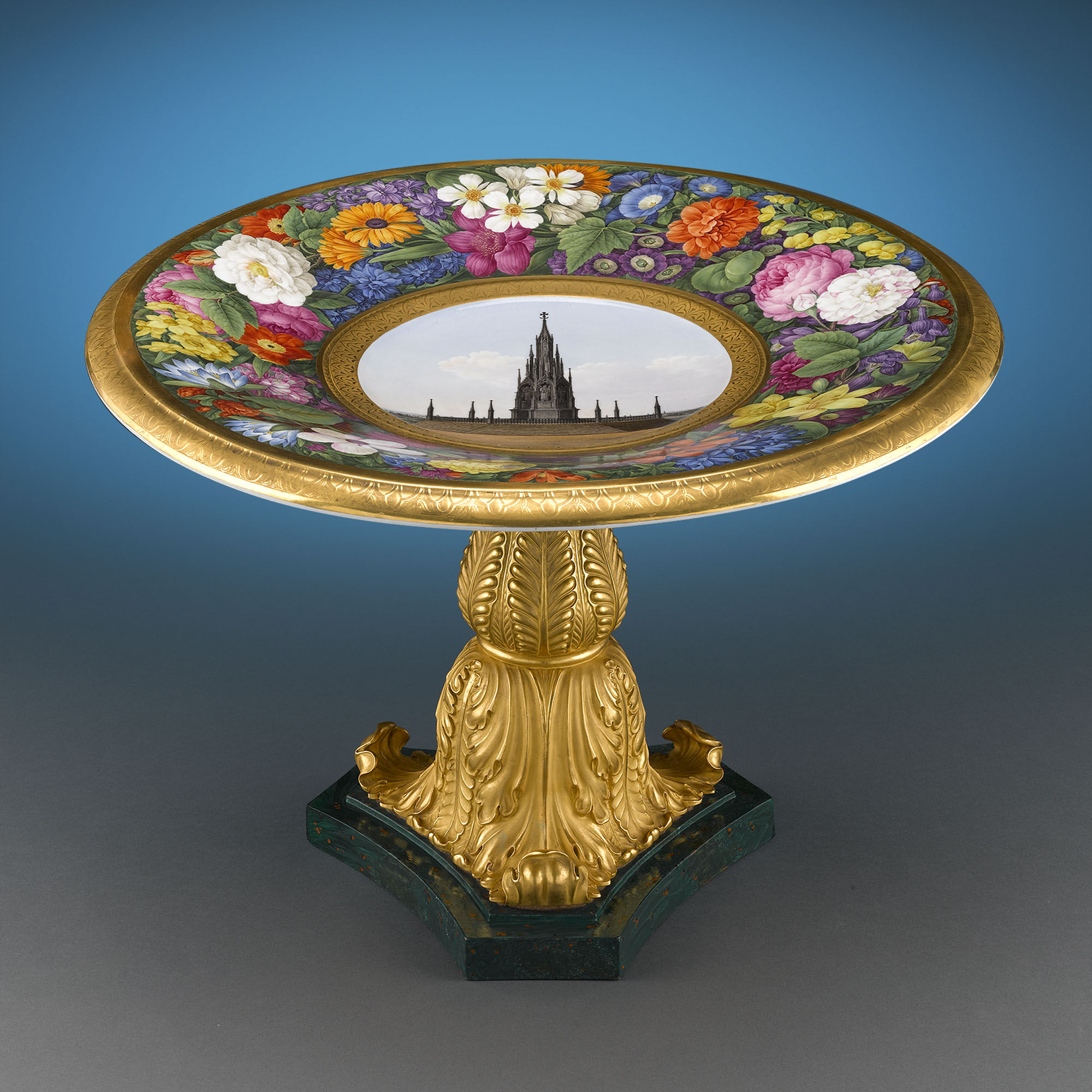
Created for Pope Pius VII by special order of Frederick William III of Prussia, c. 1823

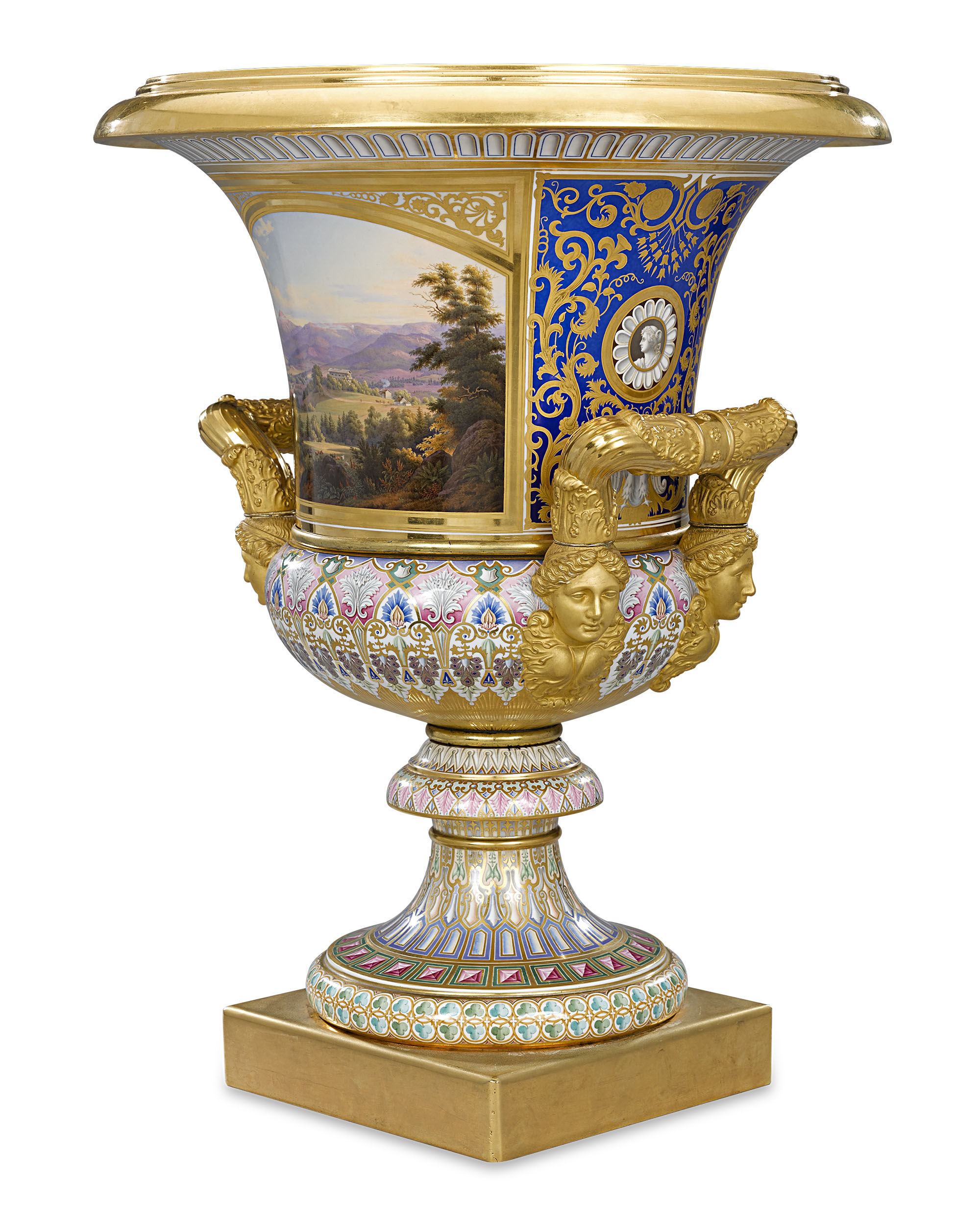
KPM porcelain krater vase given by Frederick William IV of Prussia to his sister Alexandrine, Grand Duchess of Mecklenburg-Schwerin, c. 1851

Towards the end of the century Neoclassical designs were introduced, beginning another enduring feature of the factory; this began in the 1770s, so preceding Frederick the Great's death in 1786, despite his own preference for Rococo styles. The cheerful soft-brush forms of Rococo gave way to the harder lines of Neoclassicism.

Frederick the Great's successor, his nephew Frederick William II was not much interested in the factory, but it continued to flourish. He obtained what he needed in the way of porcelain from KPM, but stopped paying cash. The amounts due were deducted from his share of the profits. From 1787 onwards, the average annual net profit came to more than 40,000 thaler.

In 1790, a dinner service in the new style was designed by KPM: KURLAND, which has been one of the greatest successes of the manufactory up to date. It bears the name of its commissioner, Peter von Biron, Duke of Courland, one of the richest and most refined men of his time. Leading German artists of the time, like Karl Friedrich Schinkel, Johann Gottfried Schadow and his pupil Christian Daniel Rauch designed vases and sculptures for KPM. The most famous item among them is the Prinzessinengruppe (Two Princesses), after a design by Johann Gottfried Schadow.

From the start of the 19th century the factory developed a new market among the expanding bourgeoisie, selling highly decorated "cabinet cups" (with saucers) either singly or in pairs. These were intended for display in glass-fronted cabinets rather than actual use.

In the first half of the 19th century, KPM was a leader in the production of pictorial and veduta porcelain among the big European manufactories. One of the most important veduta painters was Carl Daniel Freydanck. Under the leadership of Georg Friedrich Christoph Frick, the manufactory's managing director from 1832, Freydanck designed a series of works depicting beautiful cityscapes of Berlin and Potsdam. Presented as regal gifts, they shaped the image of a new Berlin in the eyes of other European sovereigns.

=== New manufactory ===
In 1867, KPM had to make way for the construction of the Prussian Parliament close to Potsdamer Platz. The new building was on the edge of the Tiergarten. It cost 360,000 thaler. On account of its position by the river Spree, it was now possible to transport raw materials and manufactured goods on barges. Constructed between 1868 and 1872, it was equipped with the most modern techniques of the day.

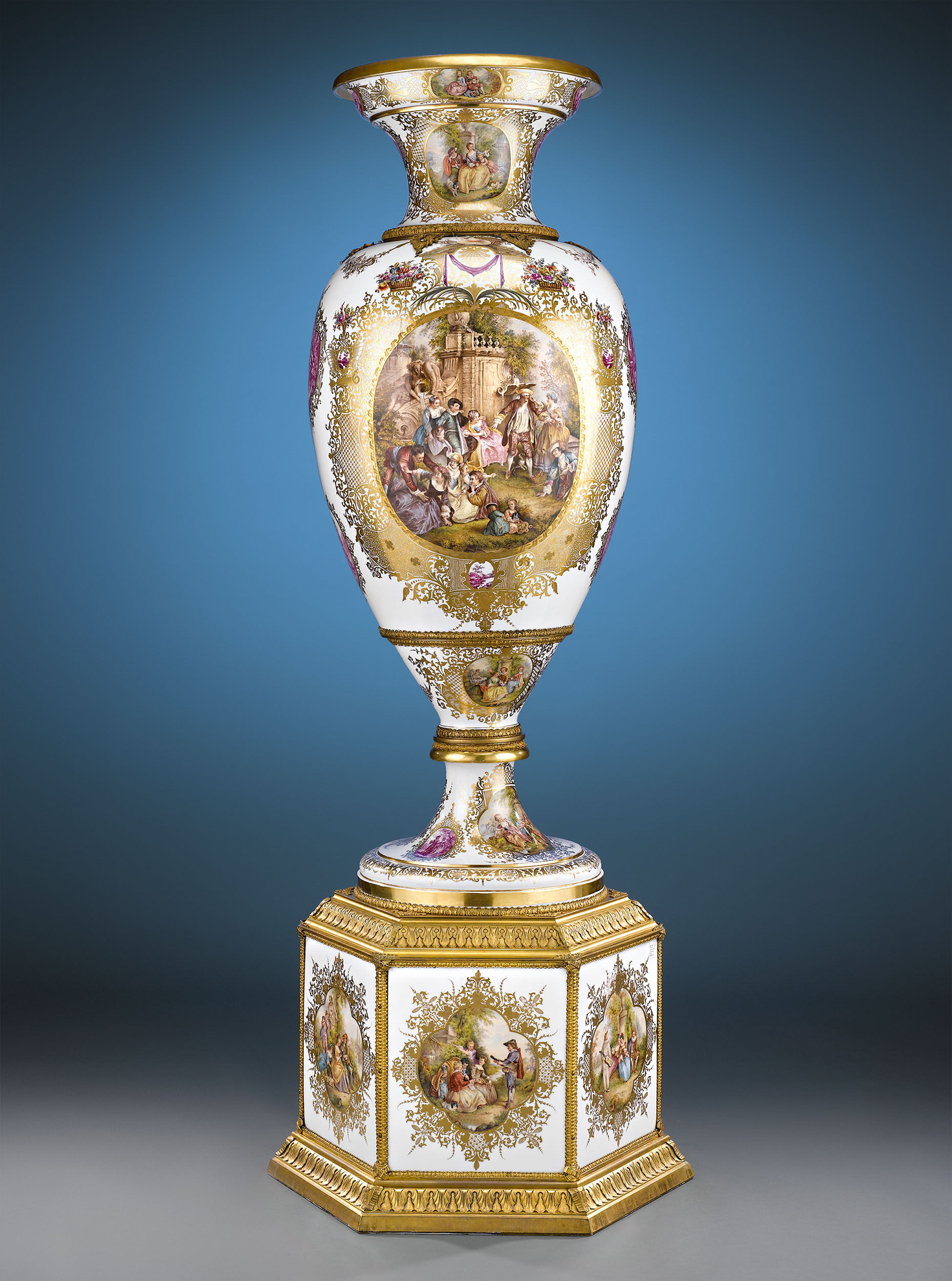
KPM Rococo-inspired porcelain vase and plinth

KPM has always been a pioneer in the ceramic industry from a technological aspect. This is particularly true regarding the discoveries and technical progress that came about in the late 19th century. Since 1878, the manufactory has been associated with a Chemical-Technical Research Institute. The institute's director, Hermann Seger, produced innovations that substantially increased KPM's proficiency in designing moulds and working with colours. Among his inventions, Seger developed new kinds of porcelain underglaze colours, as can be seen on the wall plate showing a view of Berlin Cathedral. Oxblood, celadon, crystal- and dripped glazes were created, inspired by Chinese ceramics. They enabled new forms of artistic expression, which made Seger into an early pioneer of Art Nouveau.

=== Art Nouveau ===
In 1886, Alexander Kips was appointed artistic director of KPM Berlin. With painted porcelain tiles, he helped the company to achieve commercial success. His successor, Theodor Schmuz-Baudiss, artistic director as of 1908, promoted the use of Seger's glazes, and thus brought KPM fame and admiration at international art exhibitions.

KPM's Wedding Procession is one of the most significant pieces of Berlin Art Nouveau. The sculptor, Adolf Amberg, created the design of centerpiece consisting of several figurines made of silver, in honour of the wedding of Crown Prince Frederick William of Prussia and Duchess Cecilie of Mecklenburg-Schwerin. However, the design was too daring for the court, as the bride was depicted naked. Theodor Schmuz-Baudiss recognised the artistic significance of the design and had it transformed into porcelain in 1908. The Wedding Procession was awarded the gold medal at the Brussels International Exposition (1910).

After the demise of the monarchy in 1918, KPM became the State Porcelain Manufactory Berlin. However, the KPM mark and the sceptre were retained.

=== Bauhaus and New Objectivity ===
Under the new director, Günther von Pechmann, the ideas of Deutscher Werkbund and Bauhaus influenced the craftsmen of KPM Berlin from 1929 onwards. The aim was to design contemporary, matter-of-fact household porcelain. Famous designs of this time encompass Trude Petri's dinner service URBINO, and Marguerite Friedlaender's Halle vases, created in cooperation with Burg Giebichenstein Art School.

In the 1930s, the assumption of power by the National Socialists had serious consequences for many of KPM's artists: Marguerite Friedlaender was forced to emigrate because of her Jewish background. Ludwig Gies and Gerhard Marcks were dismissed and denied exhibitions because of their loyalty with Jewish colleagues. In 1941, the art teacher, painter and writer Gerhard Gollwitzer, who had been dismissed from his teaching position, became artistic director of KPM. In the nights of 22 and 23 November 1943, the manufactory's premises were destroyed in an Allied air raid.

=== New paths ===
After World War II, KPM moved into temporary quarters in Selb, Upper Franconia, where there had once been plans to enlarge the company. From Franconia, KPM continued to supply the market with decorative porcelain and tableware. In the meantime, some of the staff reconstructed the Berlin premises. In 1957, manufacturing returned to the historic premises in Berlin's Tiergarten district after they had been rebuilt.

As a result of a resolution adopted by the Senate of Berlin in 1988, KPM became a limited company and was now called KPM Königliche Porzellan-Manufaktur Berlin GmbH. In the 1990s, KPM began to re-emphasize its cultural and craft traditions. It rediscovered historic shapes, colours and patterns. Important dinner services from the era of New Objectivity were reissued. After the triumphant success of a vase collection launched in 1994, KPM presented the BERLIN dinner service, created in cooperation with the Italian modernist designer Enzo Mari.

From 1998 to 2003, the KPM QUARTIER was refurbished. At the same time, the production technology was updated. In 2006, after several previous attempts at privatisation, Berlin banker Jörg Woltmann took over the Royal Porcelain Manufactory Berlin and became the sole shareholder. In the same year, KPM opened its newly designed sales gallery in the historic kiln room. Additional KPM shops are located in Berlin, Potsdam, Hamburg and Cologne. In 2007, the company opened the KPM WELT exhibition at the KPM QUARTIER, a company museum dedicated to the company's 250 years of history and craftsmanship of making porcelain.

In 2011, KPM designed the exterior and interior of a Bugatti Veyron Grand Sport "L’Or Blanc" in cooperation with the car manufacturer. In 2012, a Bugatti Veyron Grand Sport "Wei Long" was outfitted with dragon motifs.

On the occasion of KPM's 250th anniversary in 2013, the special exhibition Royal Porcelain Manufactory Berlin 1763-2013 provided a representative overview of the manufactory's creative periods, with 300 works from 18 private collections.

== Brand ==
=== Sceptre ===
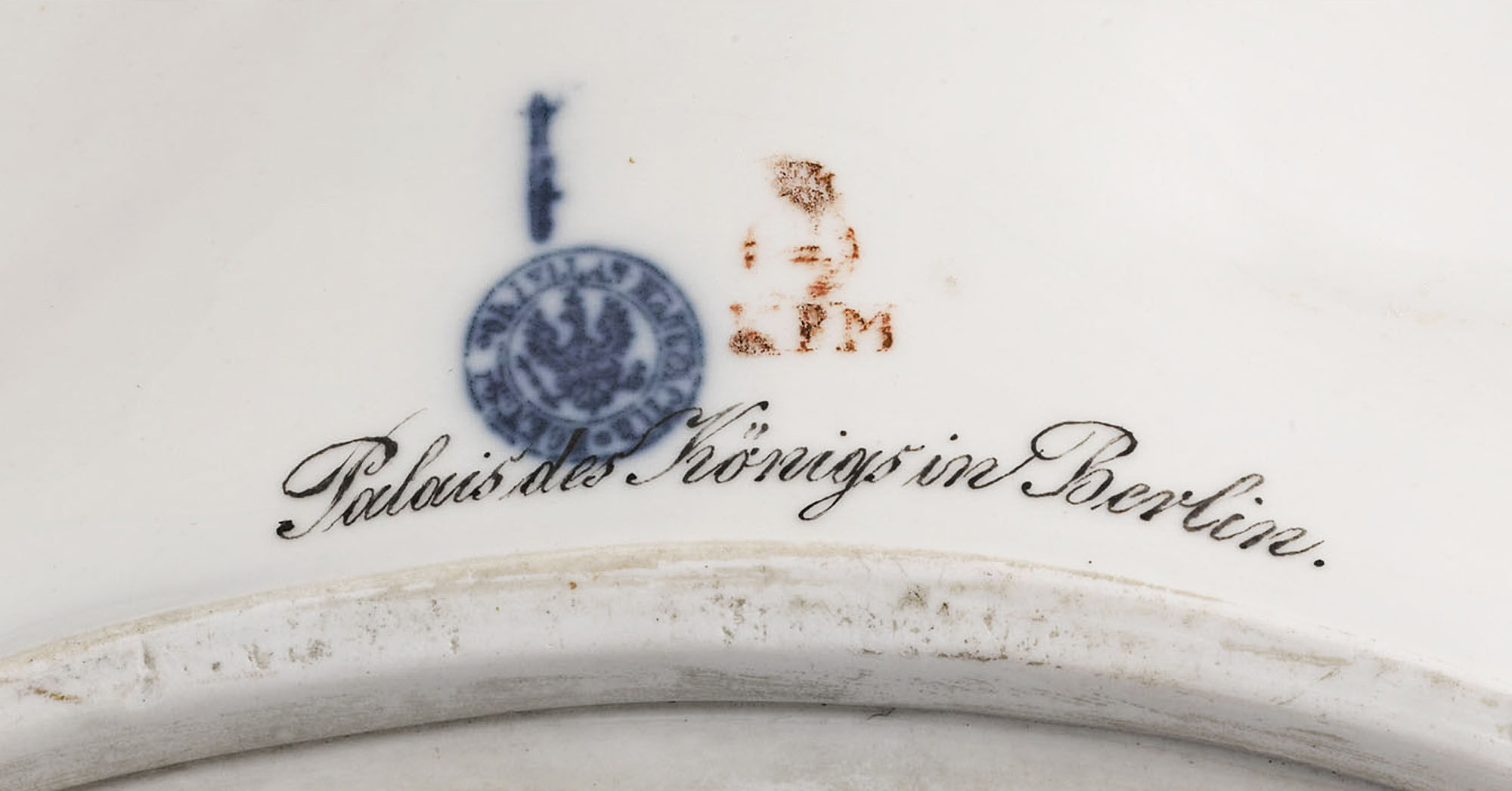
Iron-red orb and KPM marks, underglaze-blue sceptre and eagle and circle marks

When Frederick the Great took over the manufactory from the Berlin merchant Johann Ernst Gotzkowsky on 19 September 1763, he also provided the brand's emblem: the cobalt blue sceptre from the electoral coat-of-arms of Brandenburg. The porcelain is marked after the first firing and before the glazing process. Before the sceptre is applied to the porcelain, the item is subject to strict quality control measures.

In the beginning, the trademark was applied in blue on white porcelain and in brown on painted porcelain. In 1837, the letters KPM were added to protect the brand from counterfeits. A few years later, the royal Prussian eagle became part of the trademark. In the following decades, the trademark underwent slight changes until the production was transferred to Selb. In those years (1944–1957), the porcelain was marked with the letter “S” underneath the sceptre. In 2000, the letters KPM were reintroduced as part of the logo.

=== Imperial orb ===
Since 1803, painted porcelain has been receiving an additional mark in over glaze-colour to confirm the authenticity of the décor. Today, an imperial orb is usually stamped next to the sceptre. It is proof that the décor has been done by a KPM porcelain painter. The colour of the orb differs according to the type of décor.

A red orb indicates all floral painting as well as figurative scenes and landscapes. A green orb is used for all non-floral decorative elements. Items with a blue orb are fired at a very high temperature and are dishwasher safe. A black orb is used to mark items with printed décor – for example, customized pieces featuring company logos.

=== Painters’ signature ===
Generally, the décors of KPM Berlin are hand painted. The porcelain painters are free to interpret the motifs within the design specifications. When finished, the painter signs the porcelain he has decorated.

== Products ==
KPM has created a large number of services, vases and figurines. The manufactory draws from an ever-growing stock of more than 150,000 moulds. Some of the moulds have been in production more or less unmodified since the company was established 250 years ago.

=== Tableware ===
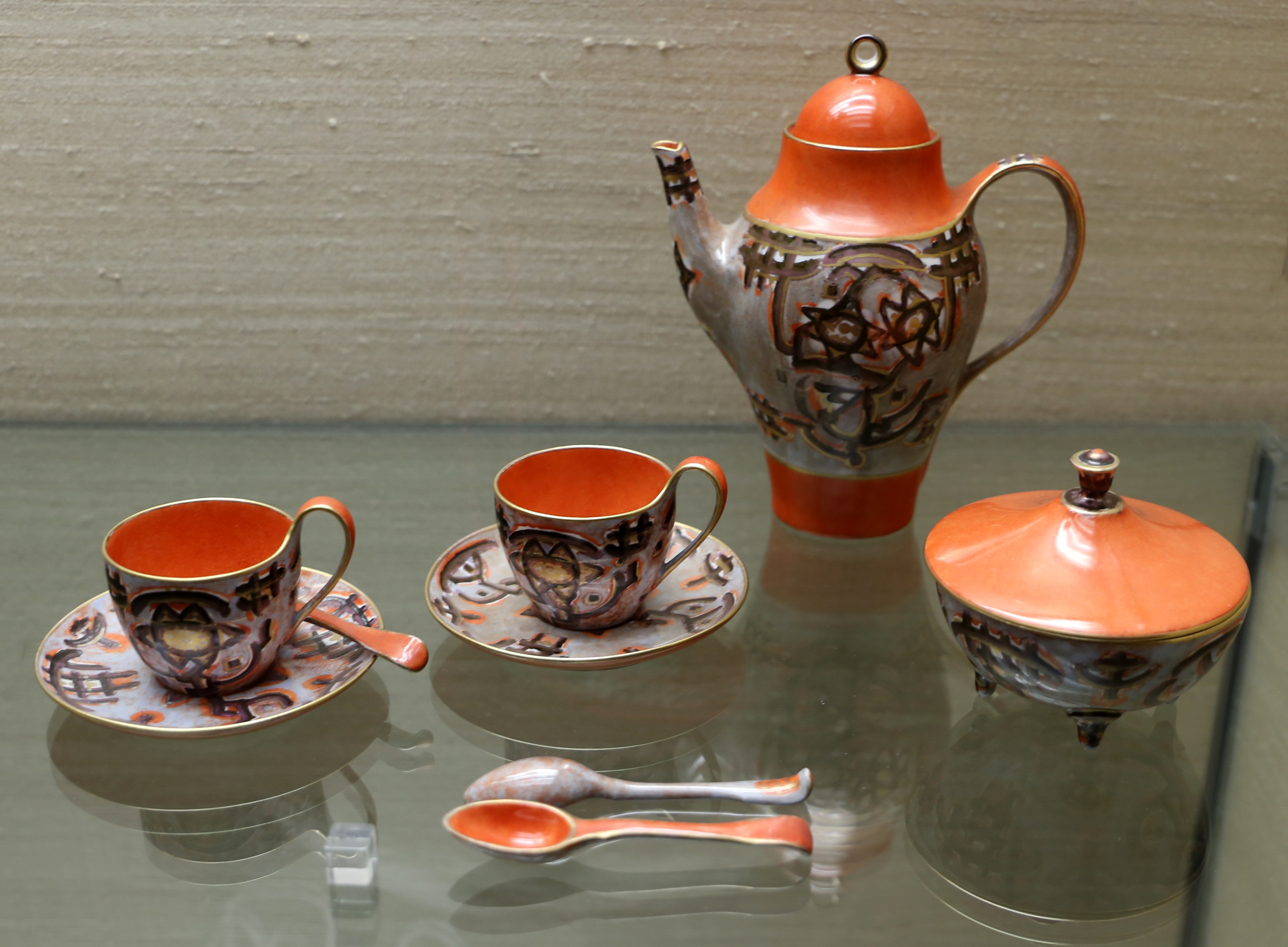
Constructivist-style teaset, decorated by Gertrude Kant, c. 1928–29

Among the table services currently in production, there are three Rococo forms (ROCAILLE, NEUZIERAT and NEUOSIER), which originally were commissioned by Frederick the Great for his various palaces, and there are designs from the Classic, Art Nouveau and Bauhaus periods as well as from the present:

- In 1767, KPM modelling master Friedrich Elias Meyer created a table service in the style of the Prussian Rococo for Breslau Palace. It was during the reign of Frederick William IV that the form, still produced today, was given its current name ROCAILLE. The prestigious service that amongst other occasions was also ordered for the City Palace, Potsdam, received various forms of décor, personally influenced by Frederick the Great. Today, ROCAILLE is used at state banquets in Bellevue Palace, the official seat of the President of Germany.
- NEUZIERAT, the favourite service of Frederick the Great, was designed for the New Palace, Potsdam. It became famous for its flower decoration in a faint-blue colouring: Bleu mourant – “dying blue”. The King had a weakness for this colour, which was predominant in his private chambers at Sanssouci Palace. It took the manufactory four years to develop this particular shade of blue as porcelain colour. It is still produced today, according to a secret formula.
- The design of NEUOSIER from 1770 is based on the model of nature. Inspired by the French osier (wickerwork) the relief simulates the structure of a woven basket. The handles are shaped as branches. Elaborately decorated with bouquets of flowers and golden foliage NEUOSIER was made for Crown Prince Frederick William in 1780. After his accession to the throne, it was used at the royal table of Sanssouci Palace.
- Around 1790, KPM produced a large “service with an antique border” in the classicist style for Peter von Biron, Duke of Courland. The service was later renamed KURLAND in his honour. It is still one of the greatest successes of the manufactory today. English silverware served as design model for the relief adorning the rims of all items. KURLAND quickly found admirers in the Prussian royal family. King Frederick William II, the nephew of and successor to Frederick the Great, gave it to his uncle Prince Henry of Prussia in a particularly opulent décor with colourful natural field flowers. On the occasion of its 250th anniversary, KPM created two new interpretations of the classic tableware: KURLAND Blanc Nouveau which combines glazed surfaces and reliefs made of biscuit porcelain, and KURLAND Royal Noir with a precious black and gold decor.
- In 1912, Theodor Schmuz-Baudiss designed CERES to mark KPM's 150th anniversary. The design pays tribute to the opulence of late Art Nouveau. At the same time it is one of KPM's last major works of this epoch. The relief on this shape consists of overflowing with fruit and ears of corn.
- Along with ARKADIA and FELDBLUME, URBINO represents the era of New Objectivity and Bauhaus at KPM. Designer Trude Petri was awarded the Grand Prix at the 1937 Exposition Internationale des Arts et Techniques dans la Vie Moderne in Paris for her URBINO dinner service. The tureen is a good for the design's multi-functionality: The lid, when turned upside-down, can also be used as a bowl. As a modern classic URBINO is part of the permanent collection of the Museum of Modern Art, New York. It is still one of KPM's best-selling products.
- The ARKADIA tea set was created in 1938 on the occasion of KPM's 175th anniversary. Trude Petri, who had already designed the URBINO table service, created neo-classicist shapes in the style of New Objectivity. Siegmund Schütz took his inspiration for elaborate medallions from Greek mythology. The ARKADIA design also was basis for the development of FELDBLUME (1940) with a relief of wild flowers by Gerhard Gollwitzer and the plain-style URANIA (1990).
- In 1996 KPM launched the “iF Design Award” winning BERLIN service, which was created in collaboration with the Italian designer Enzo Mari. Due to the convex rims the plates and bowls of the multi-functional service appear like a blossoming flower when stacked.

=== Sculptural porcelain ===
Under the auspices of the KPM workshop, porcelain figurines of many different styles have been created in the last 250 years. One of the highlights is the Prinzessinengruppe (Two Princesses), a statue based on the design by Johann Gottfried Schadow. It was created in 1795 for a double royal wedding, and is considered to be a major work of early Classicism. Animal sculptures have played a significant role throughout the history of KPM. The Berlin manufactory's works artfully illustrate nature. A clever play of light and shade, and naturalistic decoration make them appear lifelike. The numerous animal figurines continue to include designs from the manufactory's early days up to the present day.

=== Vases ===
Artists and designers of style periods from Rococo to Modernism have created vase designs for the manufactory. Around 1820, several classicist vases were designed by Karl Friedrich Schinkel like Trompetenform (trumpet shape) or Fidibus.

The Halle vases made in 1931 in collaboration with Burg Giebichenstein Art School are true to the ideal of Bauhaus. Inspired by basic geometric shapes like ellipse and cone ceramic artist Friedlaender created seven harmoniously proportioned vases.

== Gallery ==
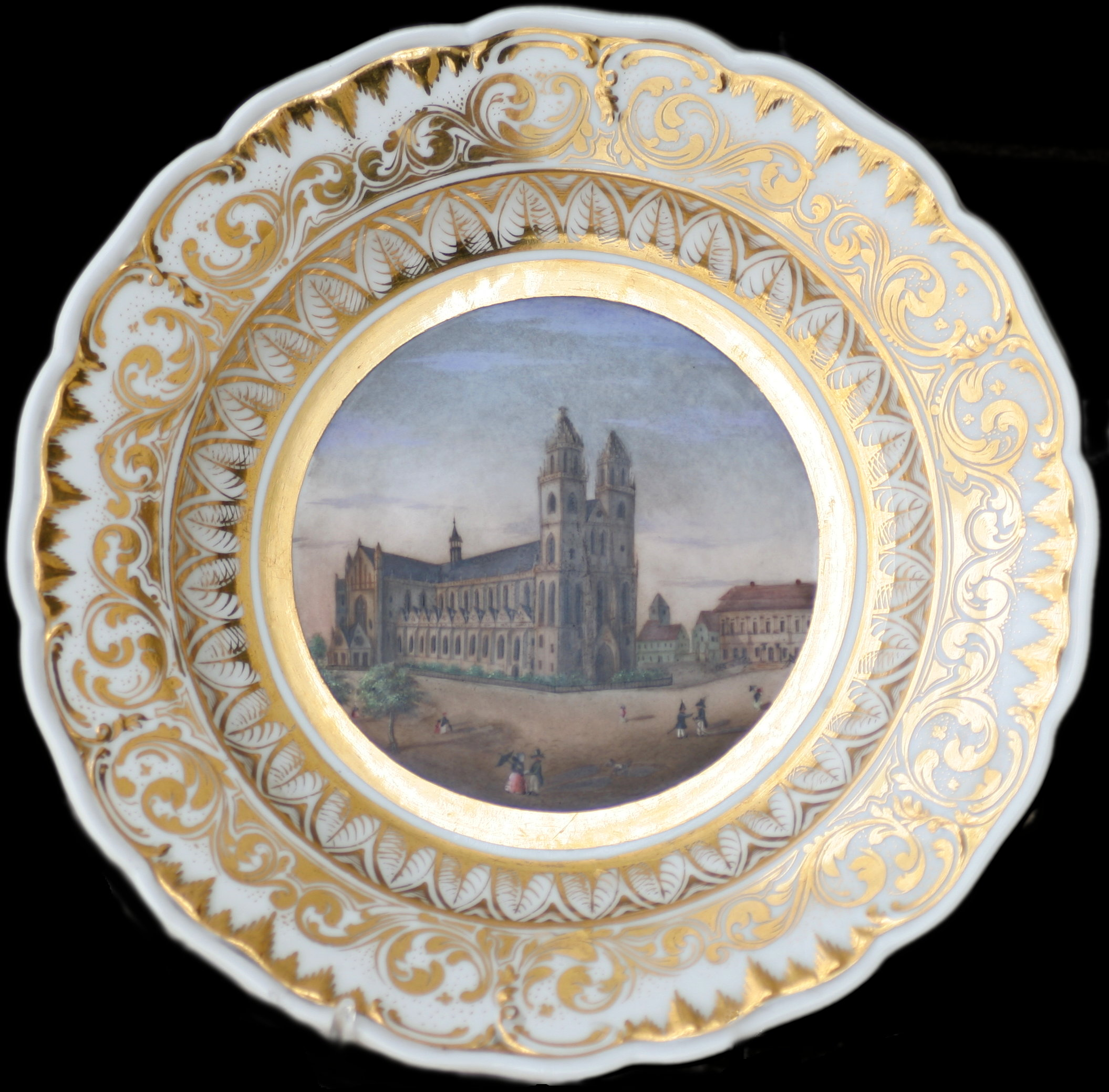
1844 plate featuring the Cathedral of Magdeburg.

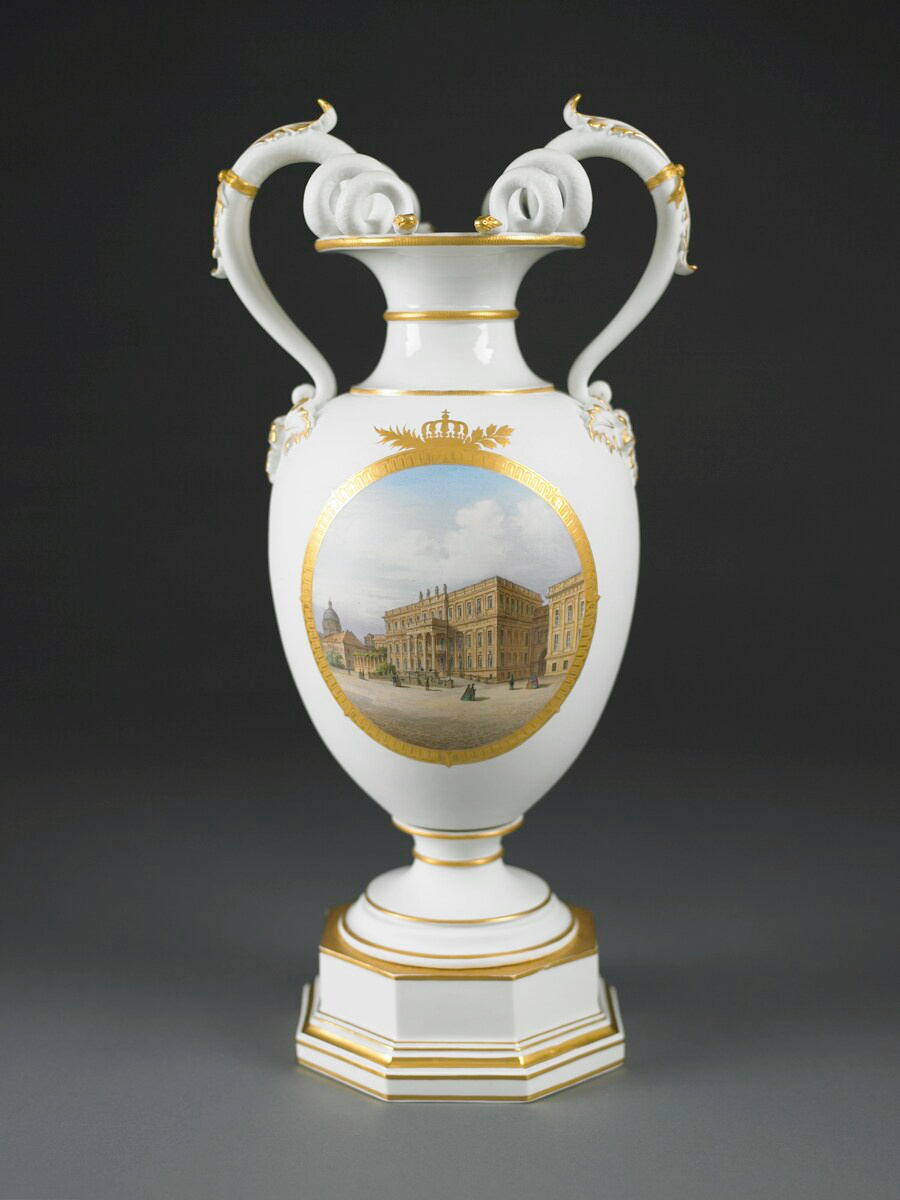
Vase, produced c. 1860. Located at Birmingham Museum of Art.

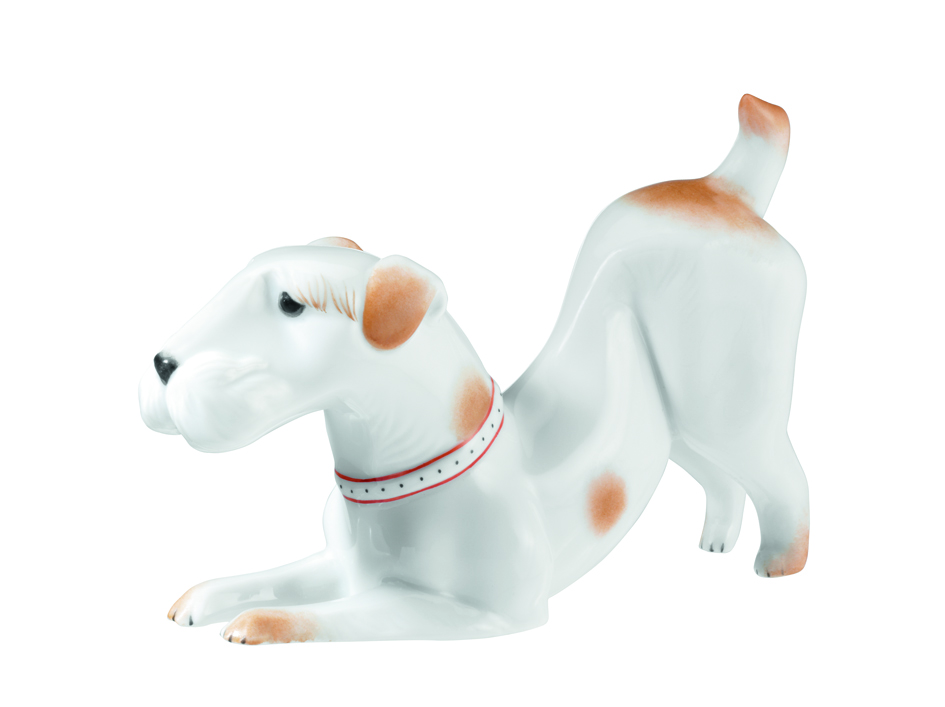
A wire-haired terrier playing.

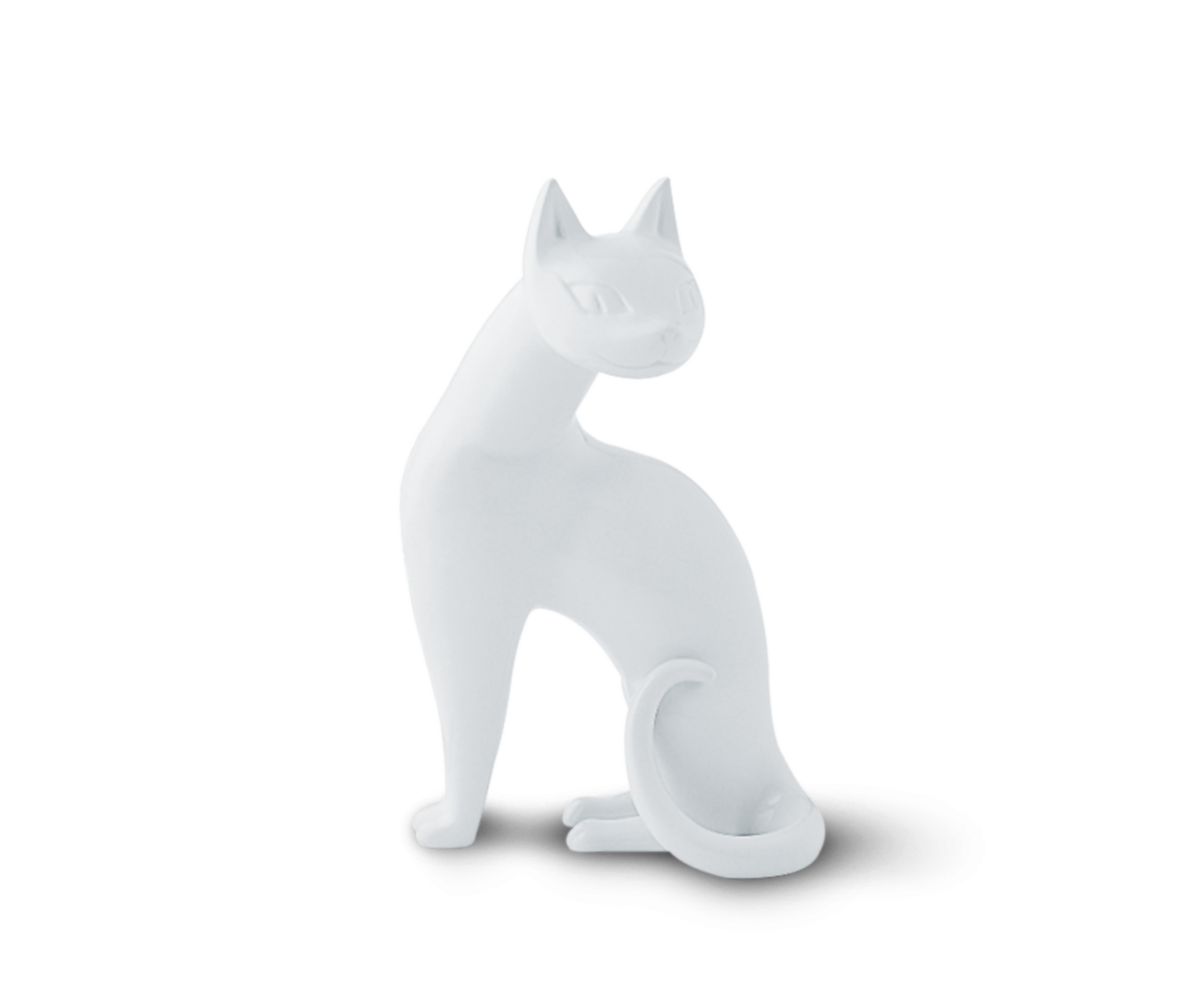
A cat sitting.

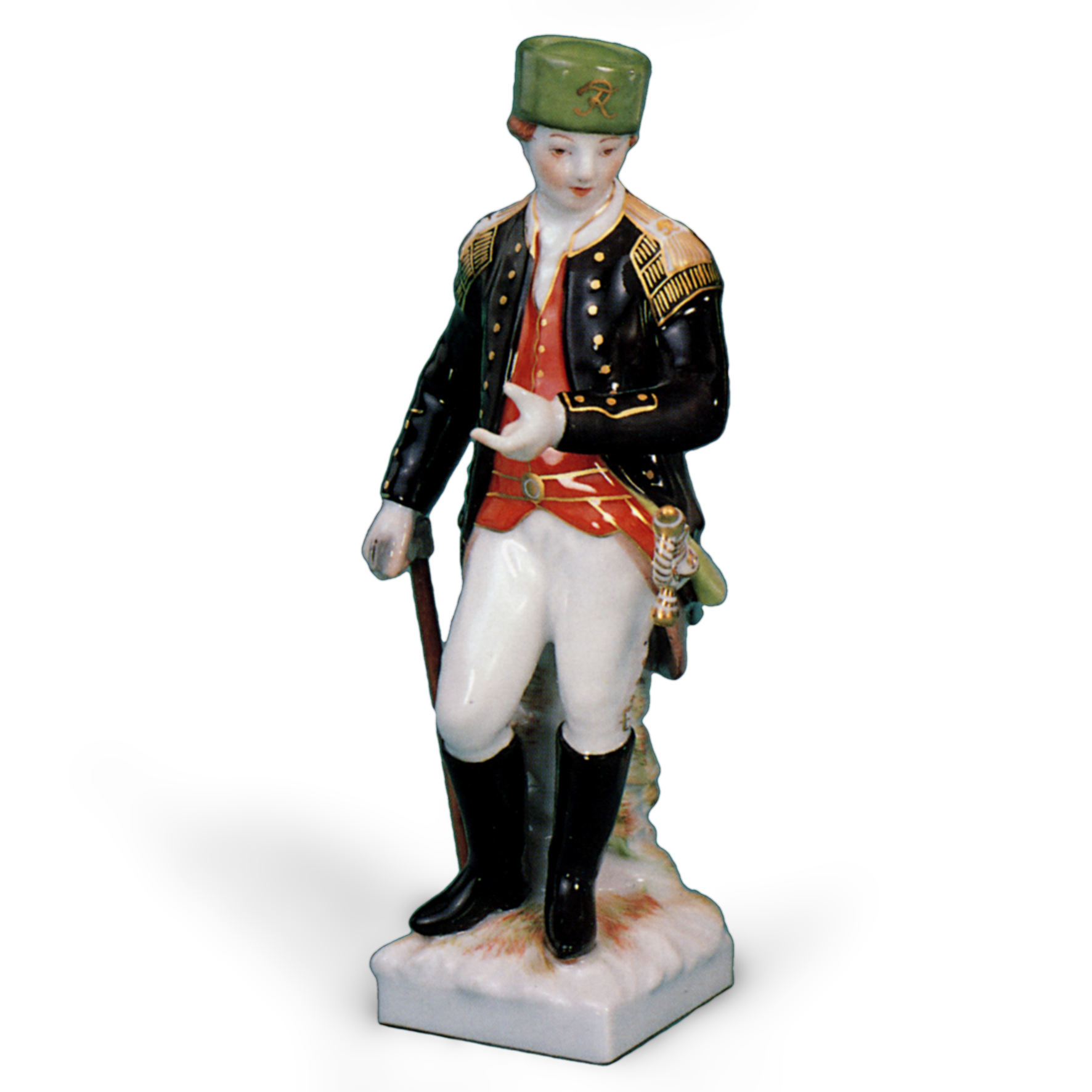
Figurine of a Prussian miner.

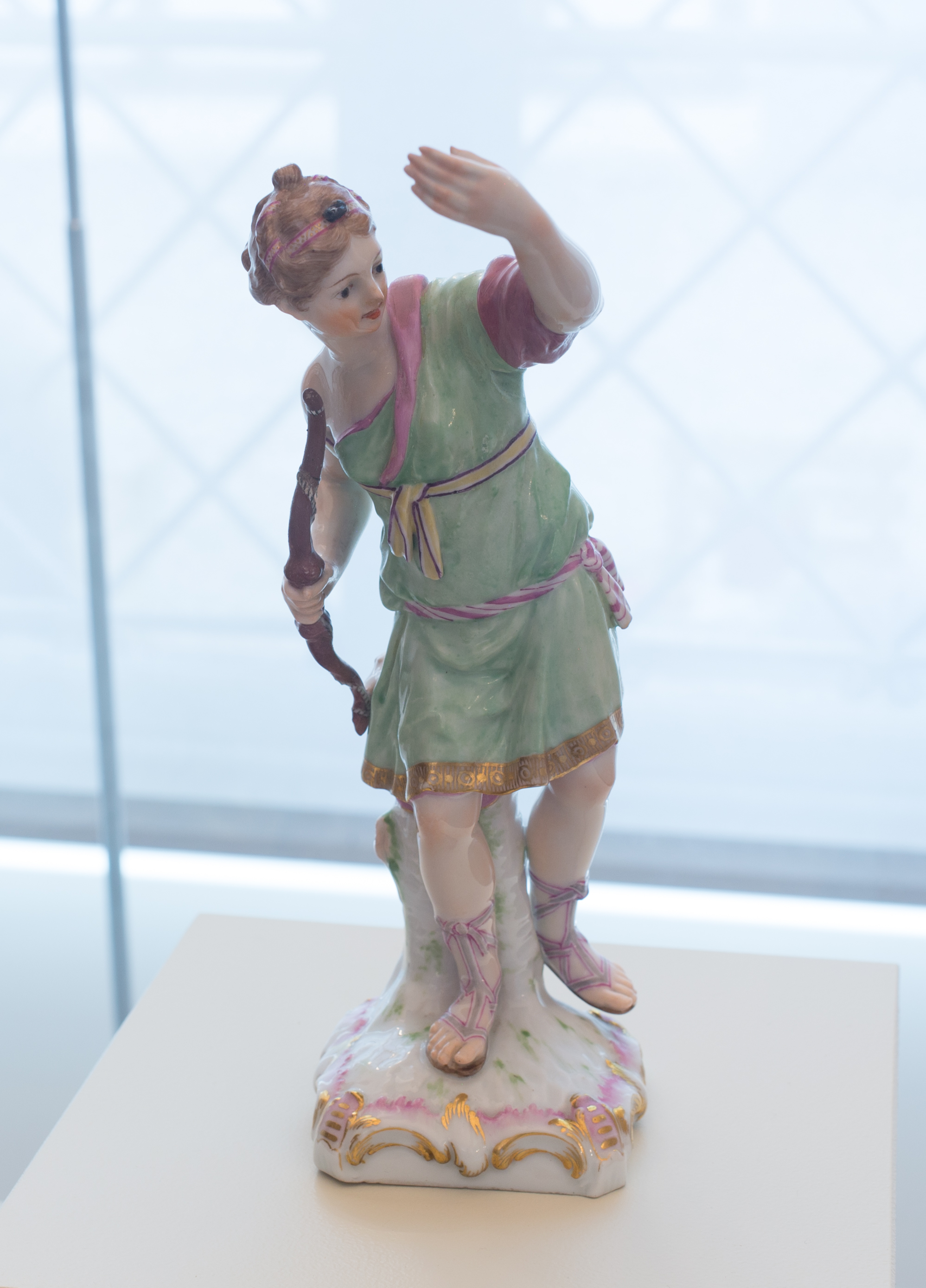
Diana um 1769 Jagdschloss Grunewald, Germany

== See also ==
- Porcelain manufacturing companies in Europe
- Judenporzellan
