= Tokotoko =

Traditional Māori ceremonial walking stick

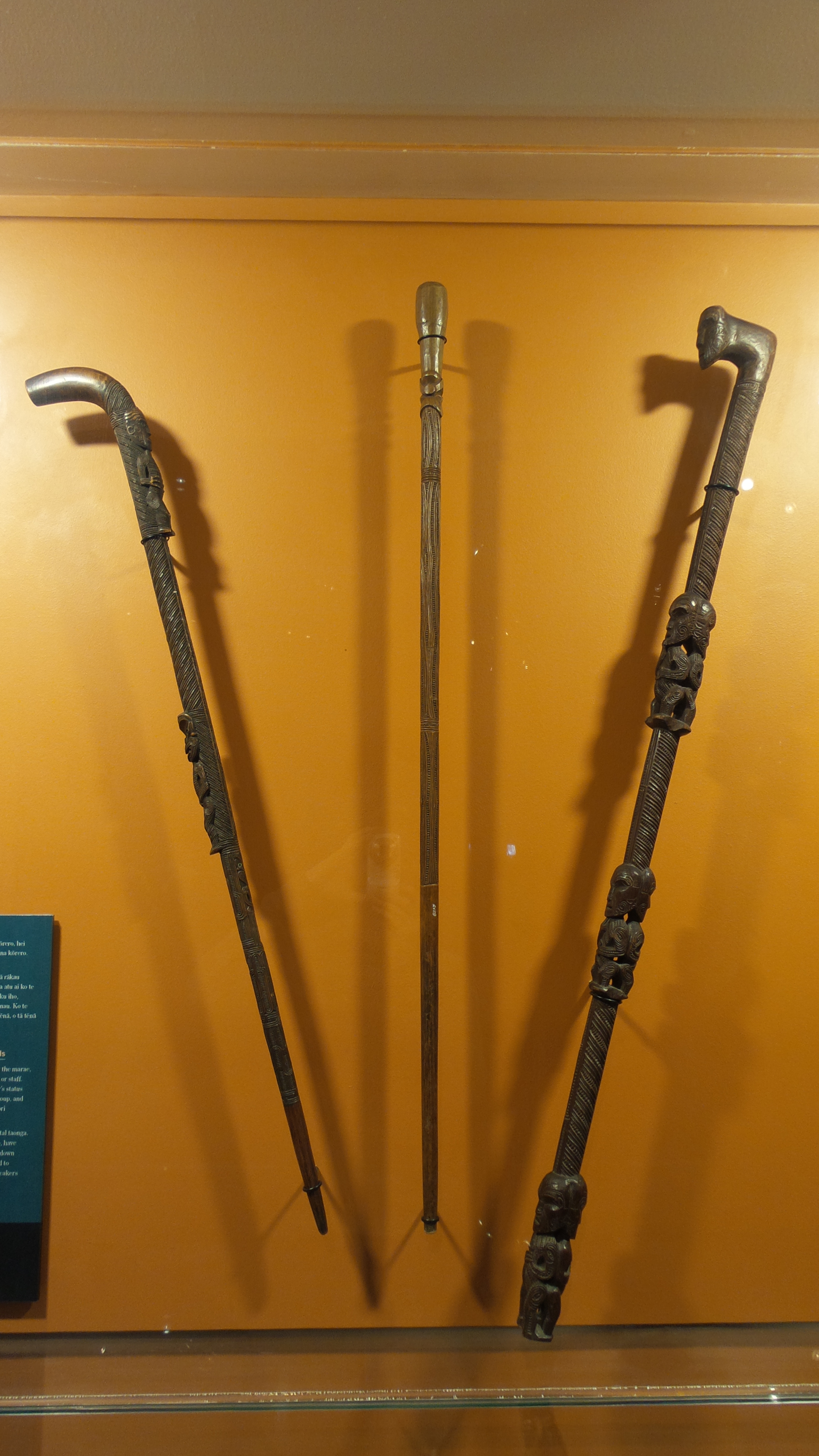
Tokotoko in Te Papa, Museum of New Zealand.

A tokotoko is a traditional Māori carved ceremonial walking stick. On a marae it is a symbol of authority and status for the speaker holding it.

Poets from New Zealand who win the award of New Zealand Poet Laureate are presented with a tokotoko, typically by a National Librarian of New Zealand.

== See also ==
- Ruyi (scepter)
- Talking stick
- Cane
