= He Chaozong =

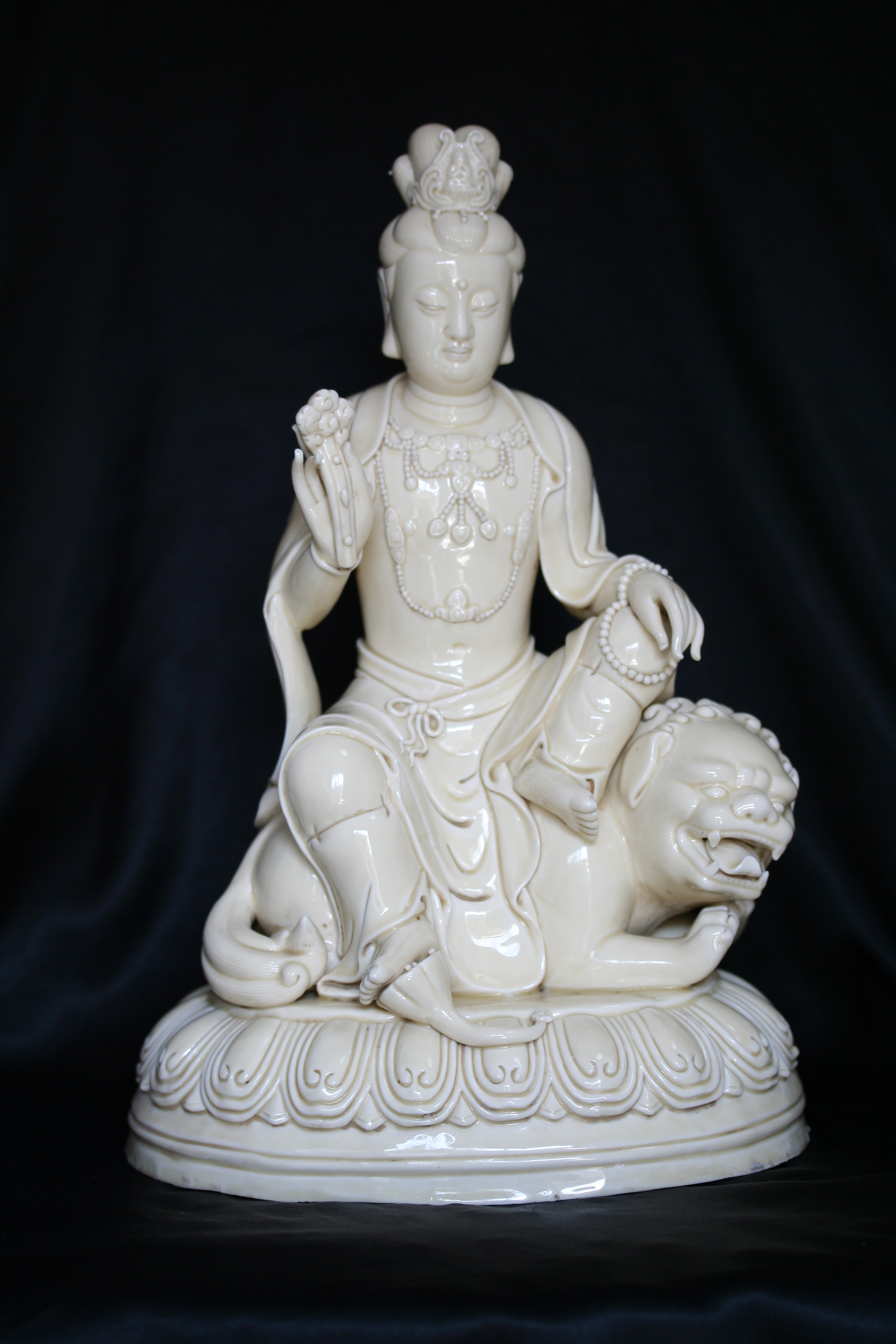
Mañjuśrī figure in Blanc-de-Chine, 17th century Nantoyōsō Collection, Japan

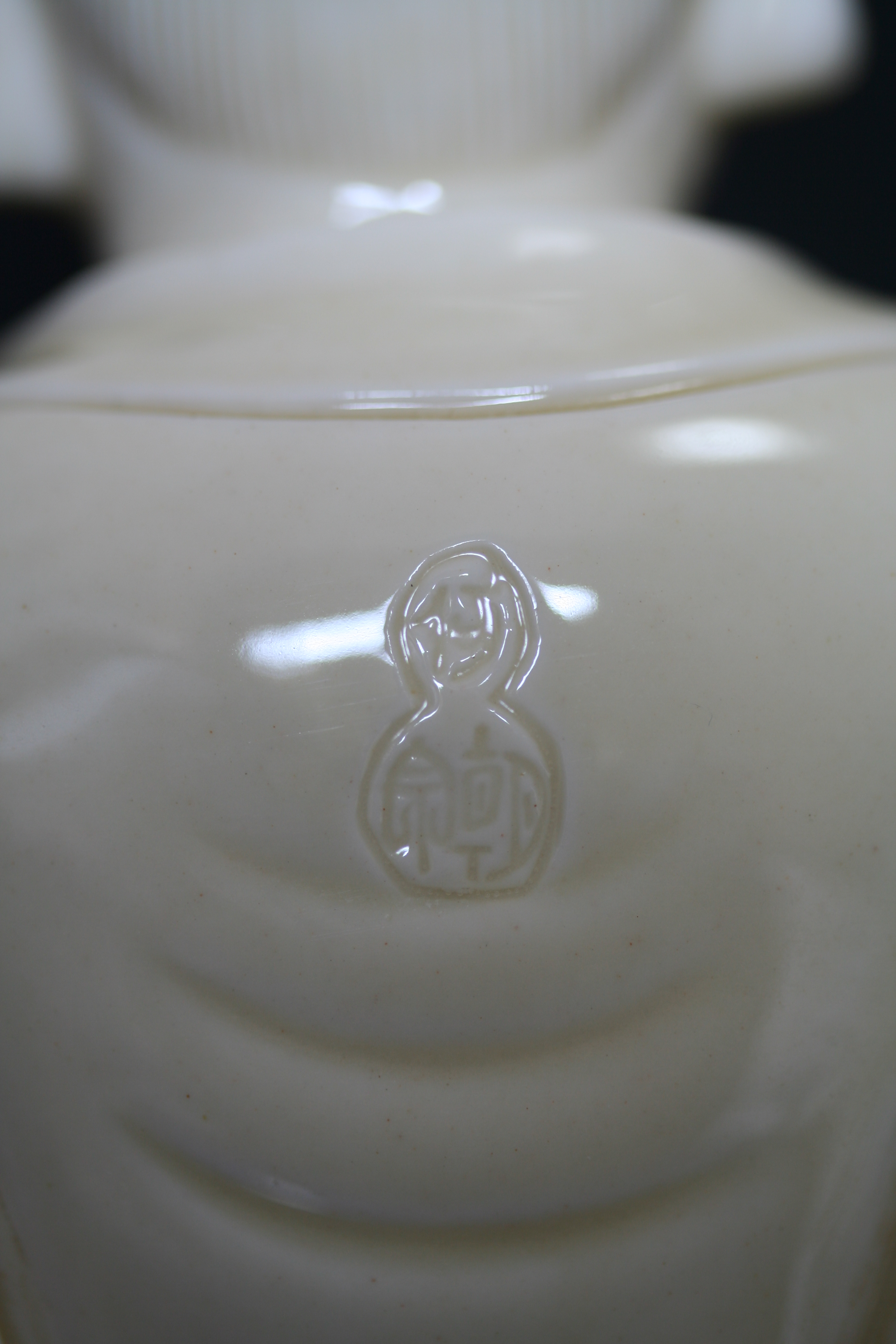
He Chaozong Gourd Seal

He Chaozong (Chinese: 何朝宗; pinyin: Hé Cháozōng) was a celebrated early 17th-century Chinese potter. He Chaozong fashioned mainly Buddhist white porcelain statuary in the tradition of the Dehua kilns in Fujian Province, known in the west as Blanc-de-Chine. Little documentary evidence remains for He Chaozong apart from extant examples of his ceramic art. A gazetteer entry for 1763 mentions him with other art notables of the Ming dynasty and establishes that the artist had earned a considerable reputation by his own day. His works identified by his seal are in an entirely different category than the usual Dehua statuary of the period and those later. They are thickly potted and exhibit an artistic expressiveness and creativity unmatched by thinner and standardized unsigned works. He Chaozong and the few other artists of the Dehua kilns were nearly unique in Chinese ceramic history which was characterized by anonymous and industrial scale production. Blumenfield in his Blanc de Chine presents the reader with what may be one of the few believable examples of the artist, replete with a hidden inscription visible to ultraviolet light. Of great interest is the manner of carving of the piece which shows none of the exuberant flowing robes of other examples of the master that may be simply just superficially attractive to the eye. Of additional interest in the Blumenfield book is the He Chaozong seal impressed on an additional Guanyin (p. 133) statue attributed to He Chaozong. All of the characters in the seal appear in reverse. This indicates that at least some seals on Dehua porcelain figures were akin to brands and perhaps of metal construction that could be mistakenly impressed in reverse. The outer borders of the Blumenfield seal, and the seal presented with the Manjusri statue accompanying this article, were both incised and evidently added after the characters were impressed on the bodies of the figures.

== He Chaozong Revival ==
The late 19th to the early 20th century experienced a revival of the He Chaozong manner. Notable was the Dehua ceramicist Su Xuejin (Chinese: 苏学金, 1869–1919). He is said to have recreated the He Chaozong manner to a degree the originals cannot be distinguished from his own efforts. It can be safely assumed that many of these works bear the seal of the earlier master such as the Manjusri statue presented here. The accompanying thinly potted Guanyin statue displays the typical Dehua gourd seal above the He Chaozong square seal, an indication of an even later period of production. The Manjusri statue is heavily potted, clearly a revival piece and perhaps a close recreation of the original master. It bears a single He Chaozong seal. Both statues appear the products of the same ceramic studio, if not the same artist. The Manjusri statue shows none of the mannerism of robes characteristic of many late Ming and early Qing period Dehua statuary. It seems a revival of a classical manner.

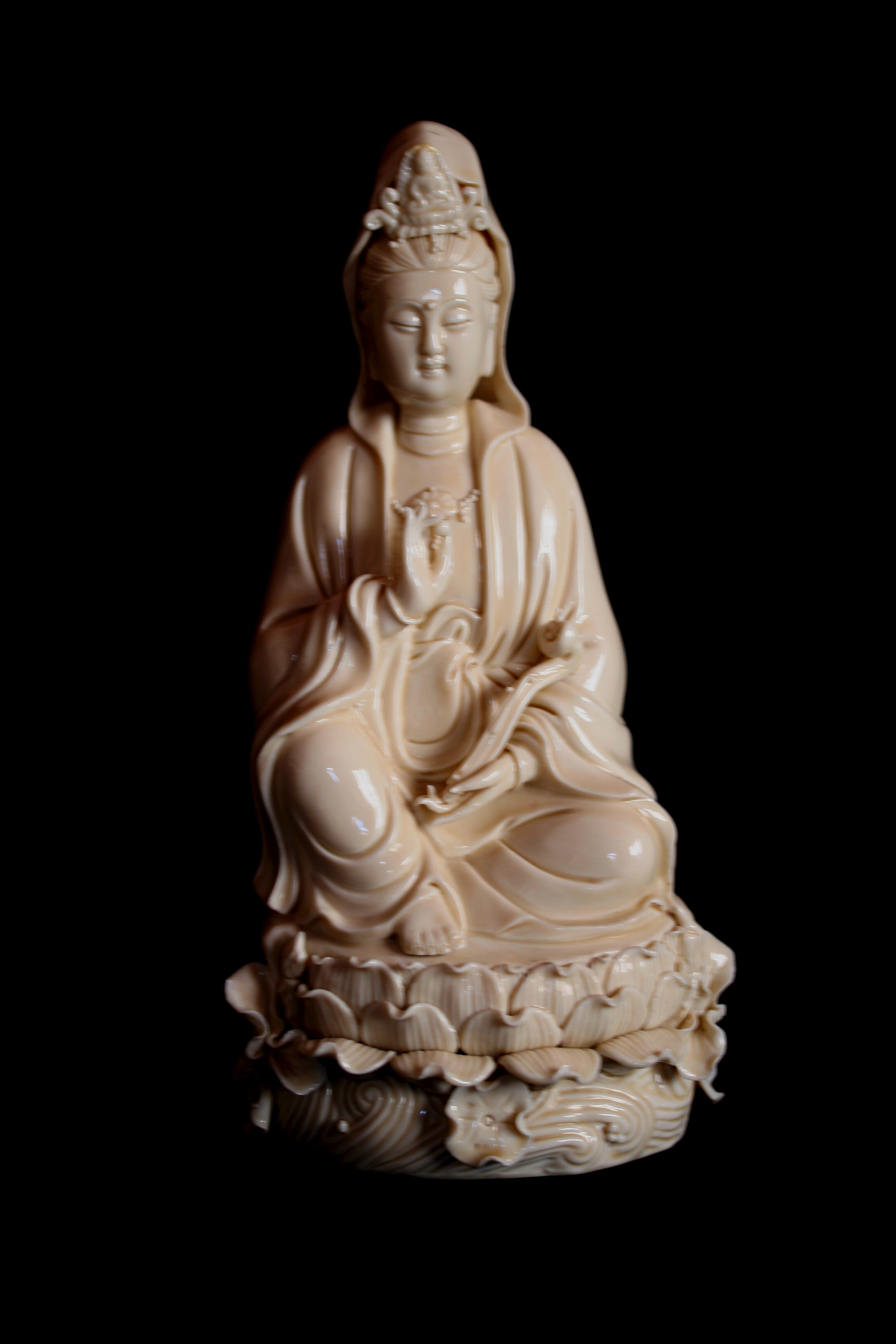
Bodhisattva Guanyin, Nantoyōsō Collection

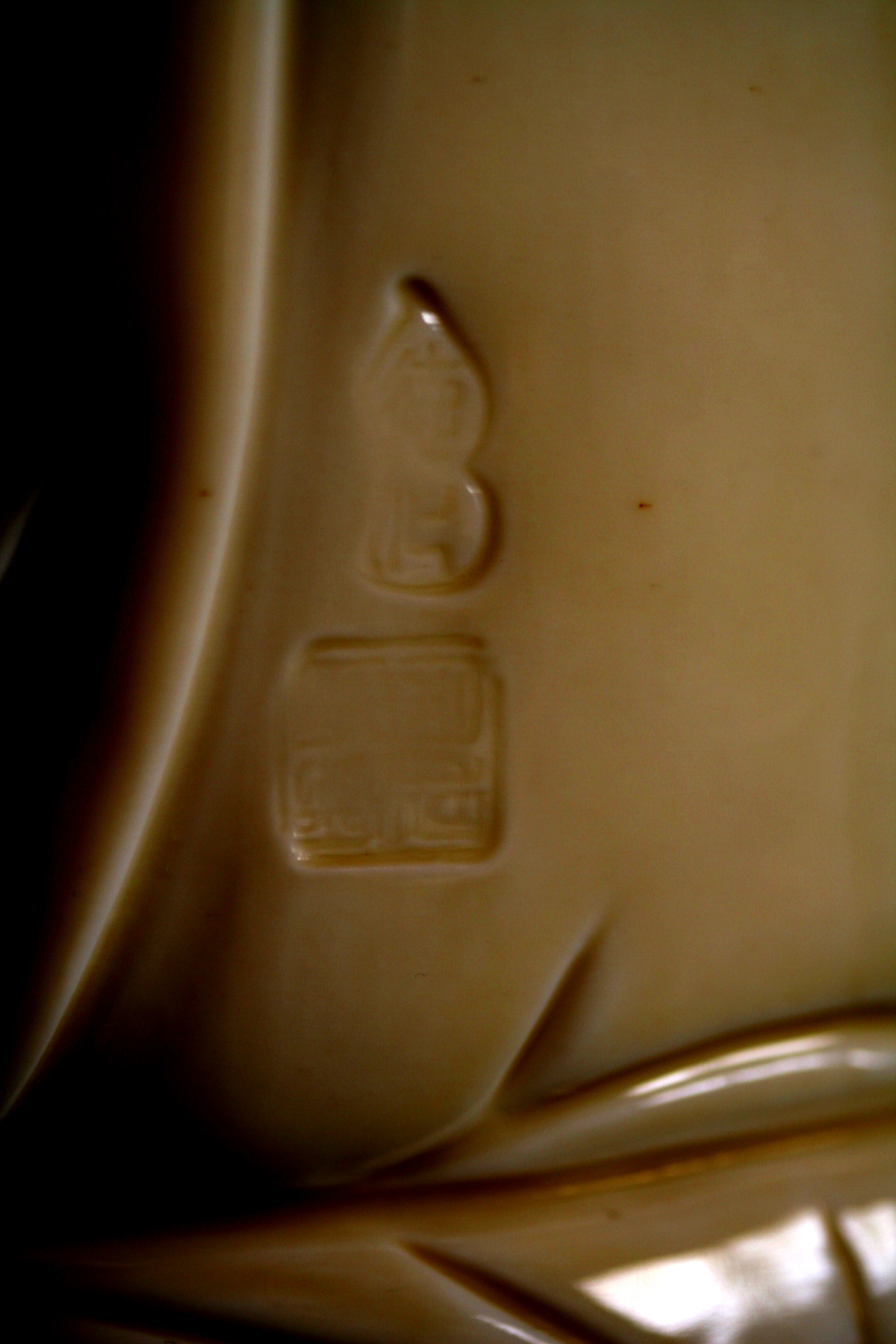
Gourd and Square Seals
