= Dehua County =

Dehua County 德化县 Tehwa, Tehua
- County
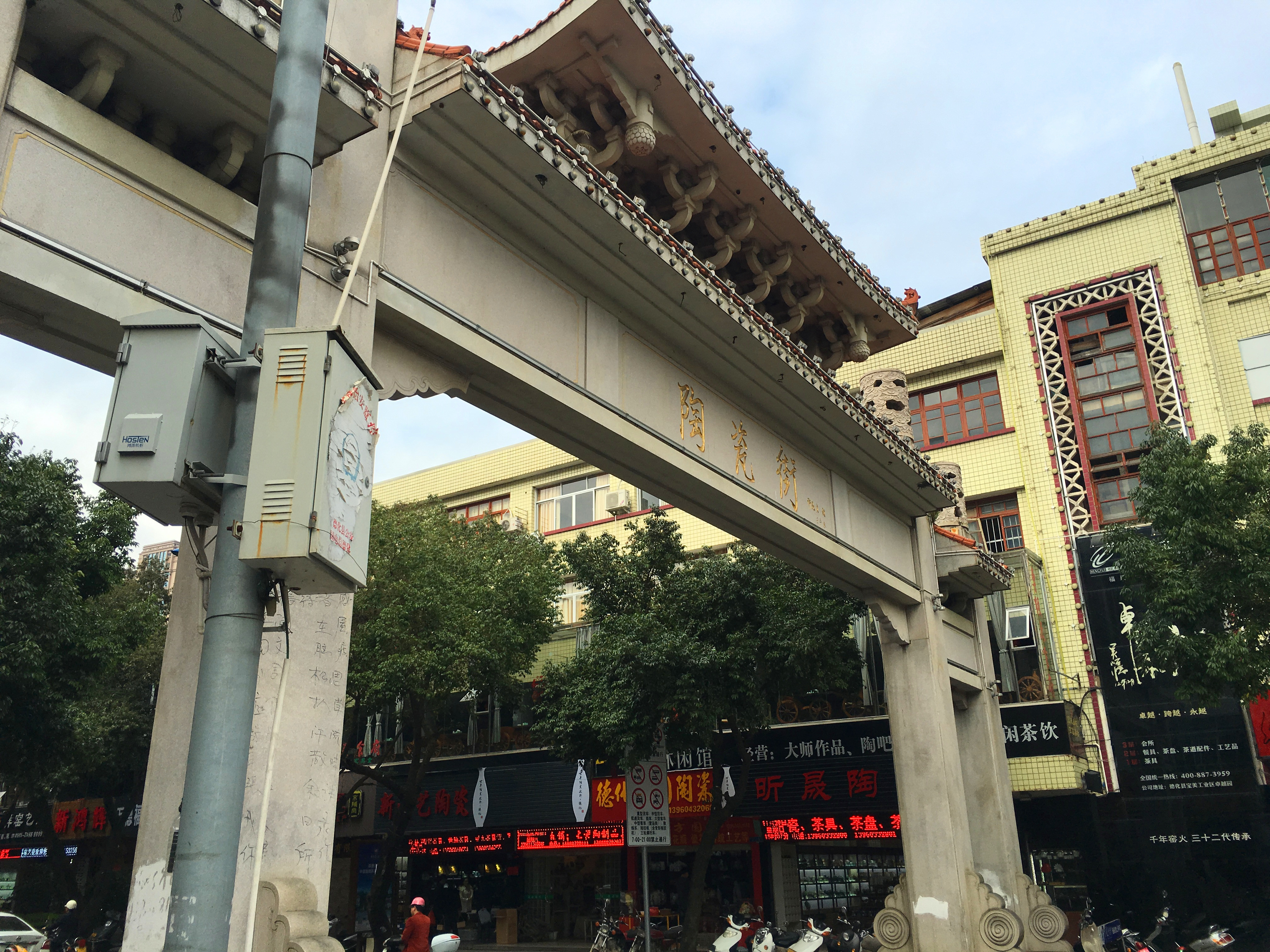

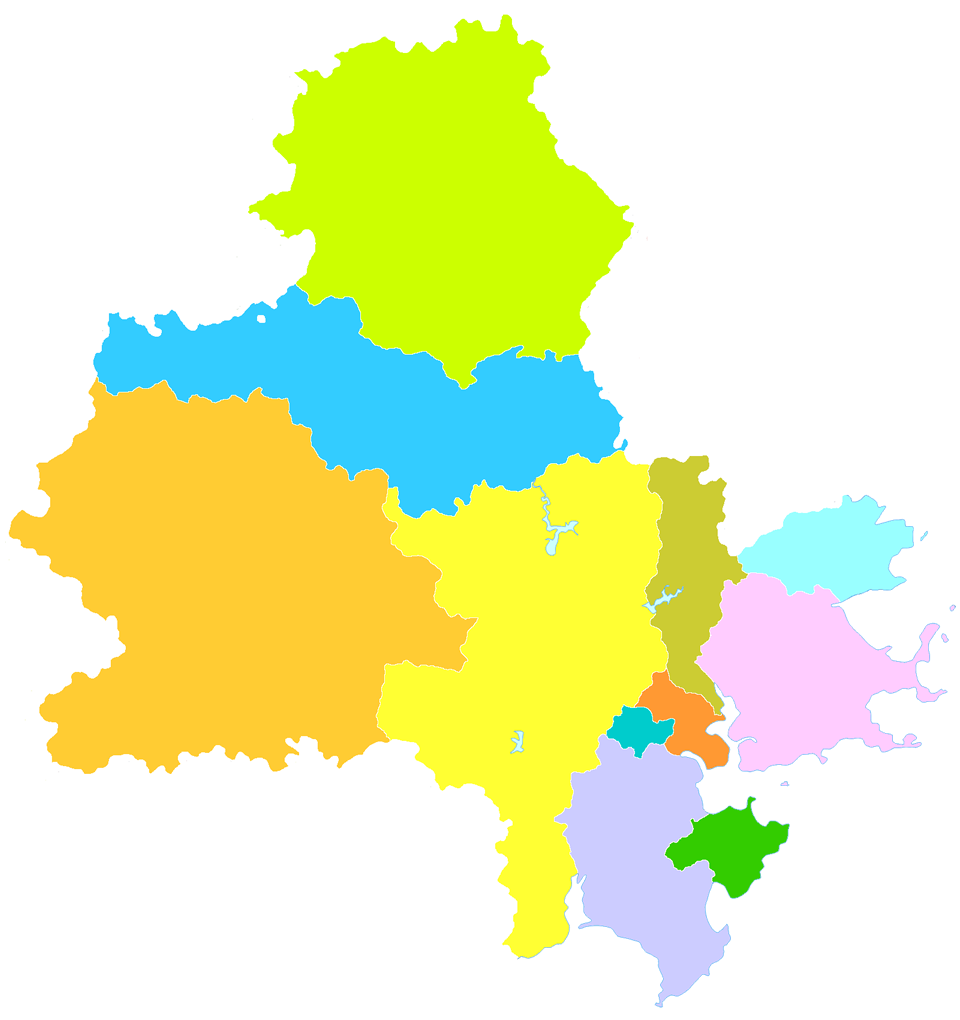
- Dehua County in Quanzhou

- Location of the seat in Fujian
- Coordinates: 25.491°N 118.241°E
- Country: People's Republic of China
- Province: Fujian
- Prefecture-level city: Quanzhou

Area
  - Total: 2,204 km^{2} (851 sq mi)

Population (2020 census)
  - Total: 332,148
  - Density: 150.7/km^{2} (390.3/sq mi)
- Time zone: UTC+8 (China Standard)

Dehua (Dehua; Chinese: 德化; pinyin: Déhuà; Pe̍h-ōe-jī: Tek-hòa) is a county located in central Fujian province, People's Republic of China. It is under the administration of Quanzhou City and covers an area of 2,232 square kilometres (862 sq mi) with a total population of 332,148 (2020 census).

== History ==
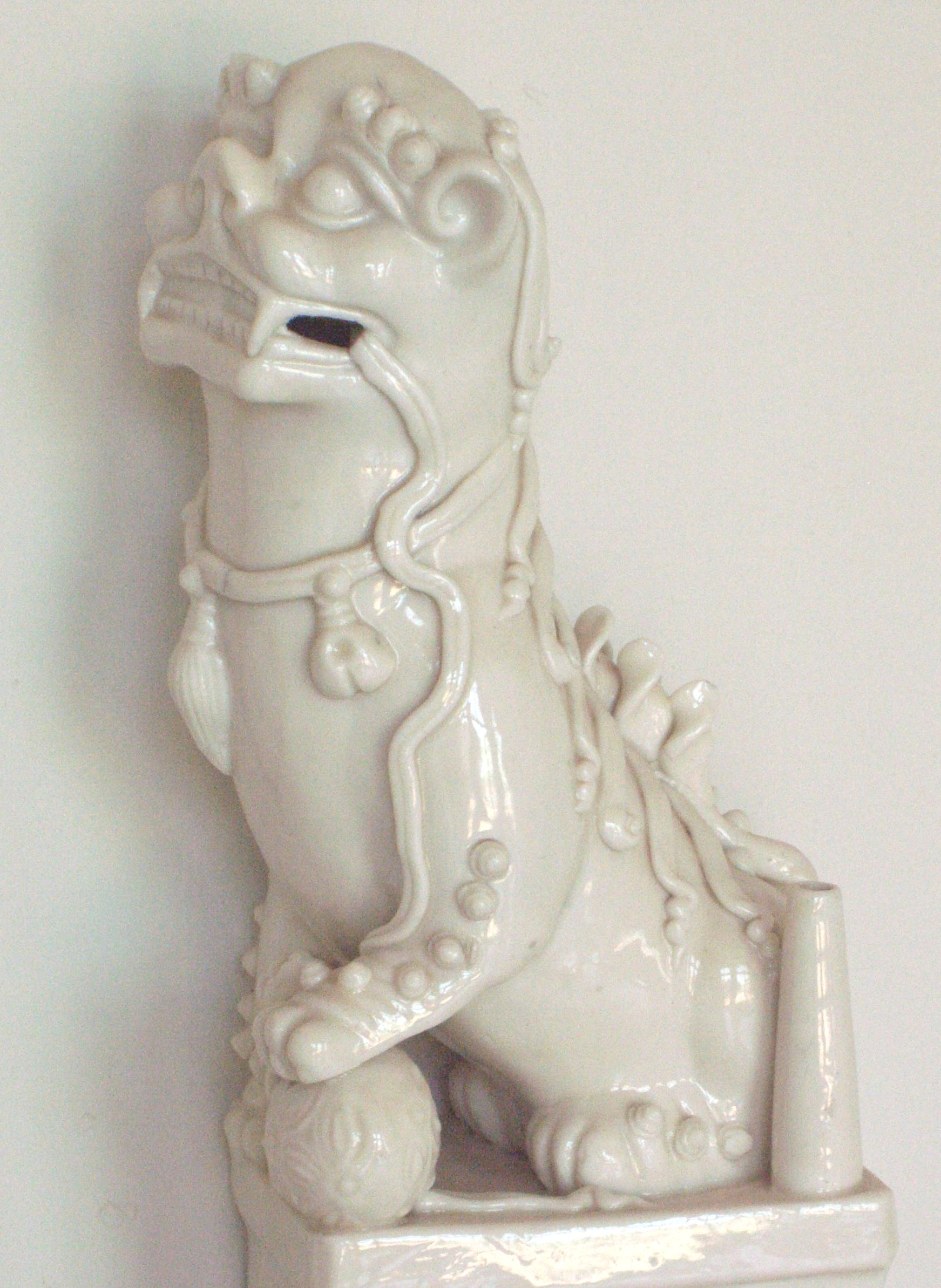
A depiction of a qilin (mythological creature), made of Dehua porcelain ware, Ming Dynasty (1368–1644).

Dehua is rich in kaolin and famous for ceramic products, especially crafts and dinnerware, including candle holders, Piggy banks, photo frames, jewel boxes, flower baskets, jars, vases, plaques, wall plaques, garden decorations, figurines, statues; animals, birds, pets and many other items.

Kilns in Dehua are also attempting in recreating Jian ware.

== Administrative divisions ==
Towns:

- Xunzhong (浔中镇), Longxun (龙浔镇), Sanban (三班镇), Longmentan (龙门滩镇), Leifeng (雷峰镇), Nancheng (南埕镇), Shuikou (水口镇), Chishui (赤水镇), Gekeng (葛坑镇), Shangyong (上涌镇)

Townships:

- Gaide Township (盖德乡), Yangmei Township (杨梅乡), Tangtou Township (汤头乡), Guiyang Township (桂阳乡), Guobao Township (国宝乡), Meihu Township (美湖乡), Daming Township (大铭乡), Chunmei Township (春美乡)

== Economy ==
In 2017 Dehua's GDP amounted to 22.1 billion Yuan.

== Climate ==
Climate data for Dehua, elevation 521 m (1,709 ft), (1991–2020 normals, extremes 1981–present)
Month	Jan	Feb	Mar	Apr	May	Jun	Jul	Aug	Sep	Oct	Nov	Dec	Year
Record high °C (°F)	26.6 (79.9)	29.0 (84.2)	29.9 (85.8)	32.0 (89.6)	35.2 (95.4)	35.7 (96.3)	37.7 (99.9)	35.9 (96.6)	34.4 (93.9)	33.2 (91.8)	32.5 (90.5)	27.9 (82.2)	37.7 (99.9)
Mean daily maximum °C (°F)	15.4 (59.7)	16.7 (62.1)	19.2 (66.6)	23.4 (74.1)	26.4 (79.5)	29.0 (84.2)	31.5 (88.7)	30.8 (87.4)	28.7 (83.7)	25.4 (77.7)	21.5 (70.7)	17.3 (63.1)	23.8 (74.8)
Daily mean °C (°F)	9.8 (49.6)	11.3 (52.3)	13.9 (57.0)	18.3 (64.9)	21.7 (71.1)	24.6 (76.3)	26.4 (79.5)	25.7 (78.3)	23.9 (75.0)	20.2 (68.4)	16.0 (60.8)	11.5 (52.7)	18.6 (65.5)
Mean daily minimum °C (°F)	6.2 (43.2)	7.7 (45.9)	10.3 (50.5)	14.7 (58.5)	18.3 (64.9)	21.7 (71.1)	22.8 (73.0)	22.4 (72.3)	20.5 (68.9)	16.3 (61.3)	12.1 (53.8)	7.5 (45.5)	15.0 (59.1)
Record low °C (°F)	−3.7 (25.3)	−3.2 (26.2)	−2.7 (27.1)	3.6 (38.5)	7.2 (45.0)	12.1 (53.8)	17.5 (63.5)	18.4 (65.1)	11.5 (52.7)	4.3 (39.7)	−0.6 (30.9)	−6.6 (20.1)	−6.6 (20.1)
Average precipitation mm (inches)	56.8 (2.24)	86.4 (3.40)	135.1 (5.32)	155.7 (6.13)	246.2 (9.69)	280.9 (11.06)	216.8 (8.54)	334.9 (13.19)	179.5 (7.07)	64.4 (2.54)	42.2 (1.66)	44.9 (1.77)	1,843.8 (72.61)
Average precipitation days (≥ 0.1 mm)	9.6	12.9	16.5	16.7	18.3	18.7	14.5	19.7	12.7	5.9	6.2	7.6	159.3
Average snowy days	0.3	0.1	0	0	0	0	0	0	0	0	0	0	0.4
Average relative humidity (%)	77	80	80	80	81	82	79	81	79	74	75	75	79
Mean monthly sunshine hours	129.3	104.2	110.0	120.8	131.5	147.3	224.8	196.5	173.7	187.6	159.7	158.9	1,844.3
Percentage possible sunshine	39	33	30	32	32	36	54	49	47	53	49	49	42
Source: China Meteorological Administration All-time May high

Climate data for Jiuxian Mountain, elevation 1,654 m (5,427 ft), (1991–2020 normals, extremes 1981–present)
Month	Jan	Feb	Mar	Apr	May	Jun	Jul	Aug	Sep	Oct	Nov	Dec	Year
Record high °C (°F)	19.0 (66.2)	23.8 (74.8)	22.8 (73.0)	24.6 (76.3)	26.7 (80.1)	27.3 (81.1)	29.9 (85.8)	28.1 (82.6)	26.2 (79.2)	25.3 (77.5)	24.0 (75.2)	19.0 (66.2)	29.9 (85.8)
Mean daily maximum °C (°F)	9.5 (49.1)	10.6 (51.1)	12.9 (55.2)	16.5 (61.7)	19.1 (66.4)	21.0 (69.8)	23.1 (73.6)	22.7 (72.9)	20.3 (68.5)	17.0 (62.6)	14.2 (57.6)	10.6 (51.1)	16.5 (61.6)
Daily mean °C (°F)	5.4 (41.7)	6.8 (44.2)	9.3 (48.7)	12.8 (55.0)	15.8 (60.4)	17.9 (64.2)	19.3 (66.7)	19.1 (66.4)	16.8 (62.2)	13.2 (55.8)	10.1 (50.2)	6.4 (43.5)	12.7 (54.9)
Mean daily minimum °C (°F)	2.3 (36.1)	3.7 (38.7)	6.3 (43.3)	10.0 (50.0)	13.3 (55.9)	15.8 (60.4)	16.9 (62.4)	16.8 (62.2)	14.6 (58.3)	10.6 (51.1)	7.2 (45.0)	3.1 (37.6)	10.0 (50.1)
Record low °C (°F)	−15.6 (3.9)	−11.1 (12.0)	−11.4 (11.5)	−4.5 (23.9)	2.5 (36.5)	5.8 (42.4)	12.3 (54.1)	13.1 (55.6)	5.0 (41.0)	−2.2 (28.0)	−5.4 (22.3)	−13.6 (7.5)	−15.6 (3.9)
Average precipitation mm (inches)	61.2 (2.41)	87.2 (3.43)	145.3 (5.72)	160.5 (6.32)	237.0 (9.33)	250.3 (9.85)	183.5 (7.22)	297.3 (11.70)	144.0 (5.67)	64.0 (2.52)	62.6 (2.46)	49.9 (1.96)	1,742.8 (68.59)
Average precipitation days (≥ 0.1 mm)	11.4	14.7	19.4	18.7	21.3	21.0	17.5	21.0	16.7	12.6	12.7	11.4	198.4
Average snowy days	0.5	0.3	0.1	0	0	0	0	0	0	0	0	0.3	1.2
Average relative humidity (%)	81	87	88	88	89	93	91	92	92	87	83	77	87
Mean monthly sunshine hours	140.3	106.1	100.6	104.9	99.9	97.2	162.6	141.0	122.3	146.4	137.8	154.5	1,513.6
Percentage possible sunshine	42	33	27	27	24	24	39	35	33	41	42	47	35
Source: China Meteorological Administration all-time extreme temperature

== See also ==
- Dehua porcelain
- Blanc de Chine
