= Backscratcher =

Tool for relieving itch on back

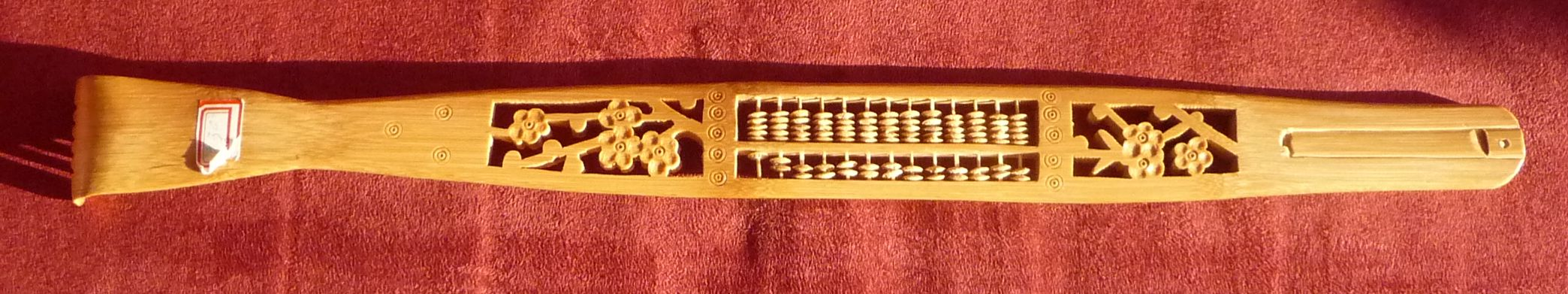
A common wooden backscratcher

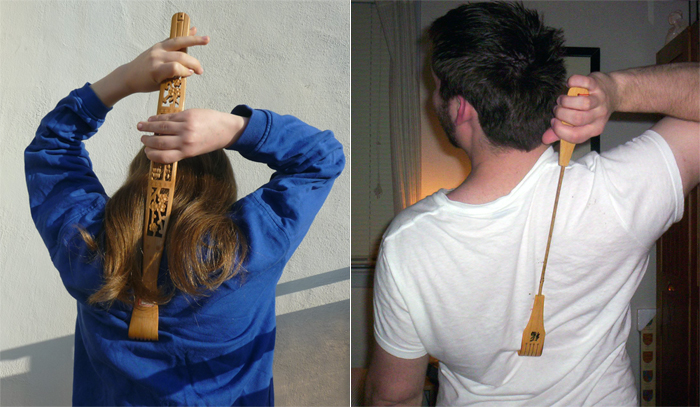
Distinct styles of backscratchers in action, employing different itch-relieving techniques.

A backscratcher, sometimes known as a scratch-back, is a hand tool used for scratching the skin in order to relieve an itch in areas that cannot easily be reached just by one's own hands, typically the back. Although the backscratcher was an early human invention, other primates have been observed using similar tools.

== Composition and variation ==
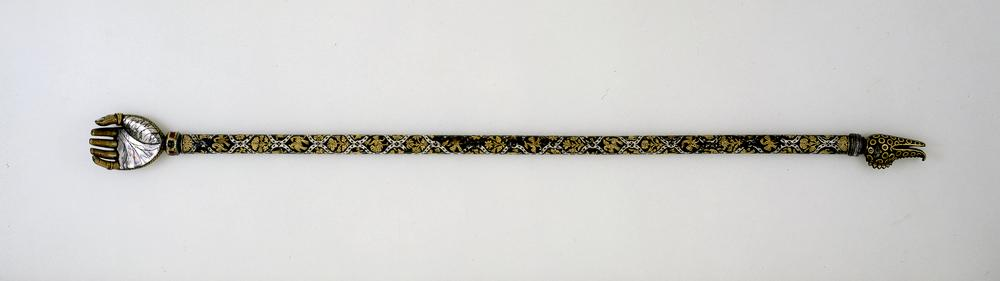
An ornate metal backscratcher, created using bidri during the Mughul Dynasty (Production date: 1604-1625)

Backscratchers are generally long, slender, rod-shaped tools used to scratch one's back, with a knob on one end for holding and a rake-like device, sometimes in the form of a human hand, on the other end to perform the scratching. Many others are shaped like horse hooves or claws, or are telescoping to reach further down the back. Most modern backscratchers are typically made of plastic, bamboo, or metal. Examples throughout history can be found made of wood, whalebone, tortoiseshell, horn, cane, ivory, baleen, and in some cases, narwhal tusks, due to the status afforded by relieving itches with a supposed unicorn horn (an example of conspicuous consumption).

Backscratchers vary in length between 12 and 24 inches (30 and 61 cm). They are a common household tool.

There are also retractable backscratchers.

== History ==
Backscratchers are an example of simultaneous invention (or multiple discovery), where separate cultures have invented the same device independent of each other. The Inuit carved backscratchers from whale teeth. In ancient China, Chinese farmers occasionally used backscratchers as a tool to check livestock for fleas and ticks. In recent history backscratchers were employed as a type of rake to keep the huge "heads" of powdered hair, worn by the upper-class in the 18th and 19th centuries, in order.

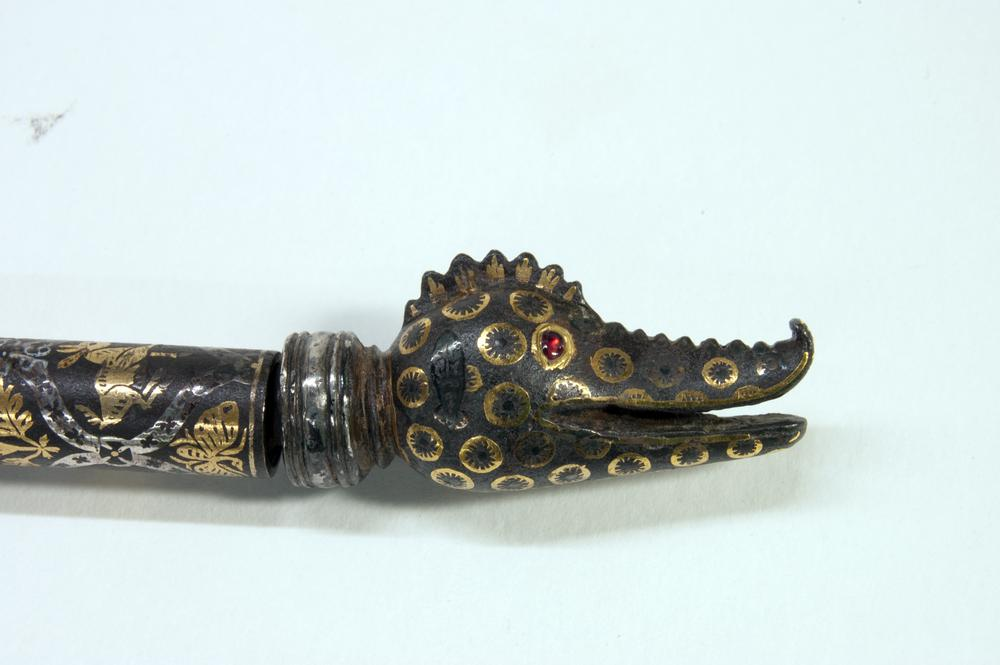
A makara on the hilt of Mughul Dynasty backscratcher

In the past, backscratchers were often highly decorated, and hung from the waist as accessories, with the more elaborate examples being silver-mounted, or in rare instances, capped by an ivory carved hand with rings on its fingers. The scratching hand was sometimes replaced by a rake or a bird's talon. Generally, the hand could represent either a left or right hand, but the Chinese variety usually bore a right hand. In the example above, from Bidar, India in the 16th century, an ornate backscratcher has been made using a technique called bidri. Artisans used a zinc-copper alloy and inlaid it with silver. This example depicts a makara (a sea-monster in Hindu myth) on its hilt.

Although not specifically used for only back scratching, young Chiricahua men in training and women going through a puberty ritual traditionally had to use a ceremonial wooden scratcher made from a fruit-bearing tree instead of scratching with their fingernails or hands. Young men who did not use the scratcher for scratching were reported to develop skin that was too soft.

== Primate use ==
Backscratchers have also been observed in use by primates. In 2010, scientists studying chimpanzee behavior in Uganda discovered members of the Sonso chimpanzee community had learned to use rudimentary backscratchers.

Chimpanzees in the Sonso community were routinely encountering traps made for bush pigs, leaving one third with permanent disabilities. First observed in a chimpanzee named Tinka, who had lost the use of his hands as a result of these snares, the community adapted to their disabilities. Using a woody vine (a liana) pulled tight by one foot, these chimpanzees were seen scratching hard to reach places on their backs.
