= Talking stick =

Instrument of Indigenous democracy, especially in Northwest America

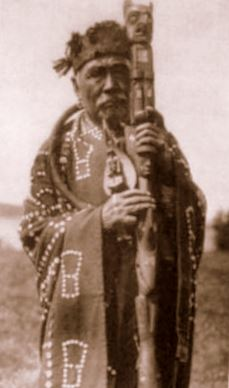
A Kwakwaka'wakw man with a talking stick, photo by Edward S. Curtis

A talking stick, also called a speaker's staff, is an instrument of Indigenous democracy used by a number of Indigenous communities, especially those in the Pacific Northwest nations of North America. The talking stick may be passed around a group, as multiple people speak in turn, or used only by leaders as a symbol of their authority and right to speak in public.

Akan chiefs in Western Africa have a tradition of speaker's staffs capped with gold-leafed finials. These emerged in the 19th century as a symbol of the holder's power.

== Pacific Northwest Coast art ==
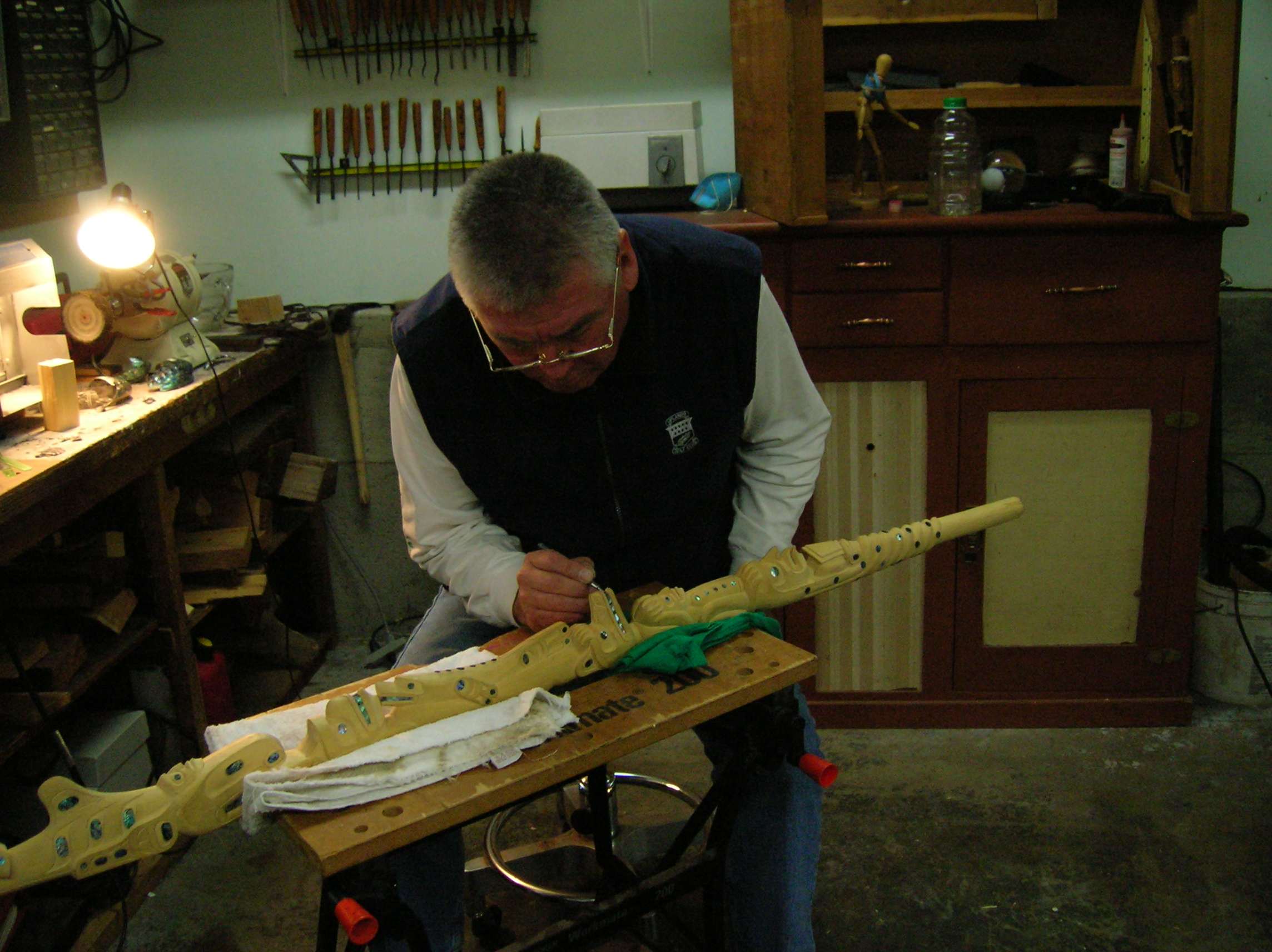
Kwakwaka'wakw artist Richard Hunt carving a talking stick, Canada

Among many of the Indigenous peoples of the Pacific Northwest, talking sticks are carved wooden staffs, which can either bear a single crest at the top or be fully carved with heraldic clan crests of the chief or hereditary political spokesman. The staffs can include shell inlay. The staffs resemble small totem poles and are still used ceremonially today. At gatherings, especially potlatches, a chief or their designated speaker holds the talking stick and makes announcements. The speaker thumps the stick on the ground for emphasis. In some situations, a feather has been used as a stand-in for the talking stick.

Talking sticks are a contemporary Northwest Coast art form with great symbolic importance. Tsimshian woodcarver David A. Boxley was commissioned to sculpt a crown of a talking stick for the 1990 Goodwill Games, that incorporated symbolism of the United States and Russia. This staff was carried from Spokane, Washington to Oregon and on to Seattle, Washington by participating athletes. Talking sticks are also incorporated into totem poles. In 1988 Kwakwaka'wakw Richard Hunt carved the world's largest totem pole featuring a Cedar Man wielding a 4.3 meter (14 foot) tall talking stick. Representations of chiefs are carved in totem poles carrying talking sticks as well as coppers.

== See also ==
- Ruyi
- Sceptre
