= List of shipwrecks in February 1822 =

The list of shipwrecks in February 1822 includes some ships sunk, foundered, grounded, or otherwise lost during February 1822.

== 1 February ==
List of shipwrecks: 1 February 1822
Ship	State	Description
Louisa	United Kingdom	The ship was off Land's End, Cornwall on this date. No further trace, presumed foundered with the loss of all hands. She was on a voyage from Great Yarmouth, Norfolk to Chester, Cheshire.
Trois Frères	France	The ship was driven ashore at Punta Brava, Cuba. She was on a voyage from Rouen, Seine-Inférieure to Havana, Cuba.

== 2 February ==
List of shipwrecks: 2 February 1822
Ship	State	Description
Catherine	United Kingdom	The ship was driven ashore at Pigeon Point, County Mayo. She was on a voyage from Westport, County Mayo to Liverpool, Lancashire.
Commerce	United Kingdom	The ship was driven ashore and sank at Margate, Kent. Her crew were rescued. She was on a voyage from Cardiff, Glamorgan to London.
Demerary	United Kingdom	The sloop was driven ashore and damaged at Limerick.
Eliza	United Kingdom	The ship was driven ashore and wrecked at Kilrush, County Clare. She was on a voyage from Limerick to Swansea, Glamorgan.
Four Sisters	United Kingdom	The ship was driven ashore at Workington, Cumberland. She was on a voyage from Dublin to Whitehaven, Cumberland.
Friends	United Kingdom	The sloop was driven ashore at Bay Castle, County Limerick. She was on a voyage from Limerick to Liverpool.
George	United Kingdom	The ship was driven ashore at Newhaven, Sussex. She was later refloated and taken in to Newhaven.
Hazard	United Kingdom	The collier, abrig, was wrecked on the coast of Yorkshire. Her crew were rescued. She was on a voyage from Sunderland, County Durham to Hull, Yorkshire.
Jane	United Kingdom	The brig was driven ashore and damaged at Limerick.
Jane	United Kingdom	The ship was wrecked on the Machias Seal Island, New Brunswick, British North America. Her crew were rescued. She was on a voyage from Jamaica to Saint John, New Brunswick.
Maria	United Kingdom	The ship was driven ashore and wrecked in Poolvash Bay, Isle of Man with the loss of all but three of her thirteen crew. She was on a voyage from Whitehaven to Dublin.
Mary	United Kingdom	The collier sank in the Humber off Sunk Island, Yorkshire. Her crew were rescued.
Minerva	United Kingdom	The ship was driven ashore and wrecked at Tynemouth, Northumberland.
Nelly & Jane	United Kingdom	The ship sank at Lytham St. Annes, Lancashire.
Phœbe	United Kingdom	The ship was driven ashore and wrecked near Lytham St. Annes with the loss of all hands. She was on a voyage from Waterford to Liverpool, Lancashire.
Providence	United Kingdom	The ship was driven ashore at Patrington, Yorkshire. She was on a voyage from Ipswich, Suffolk to Hull. Providence was later refloated.
Rambler	United Kingdom	The ship sank on the Trinity Sand, in the North Sea off the coast of Yorkshire. Her crew were rescued by a pilot boat. She was on a voyage from Cork to Hull.
Rosa	United Kingdom	The ship was driven ashore 10 nautical miles (19 km) west of Westport. She was on a voyage from Barnstaple, Devon to Galway.
Thermutis	United Kingdom	The ship was driven ashore on Texel, North Holland, Netherlands. She was on a voyage from London to Amsterdam, North Holland.
Thomas & Jane	United Kingdom	The ship was driven ashore and damaged at Licannor, County Clare. She was on a voyage from Dublin to Limerick.

== 3 February ==
List of shipwrecks: 3 February 1822
Ship	State	Description
Alexander Mansfield	United States	The ship was driven ashore at Poolbeg, Dublin, United Kingdom. She was on a voyage from New York to Dublin.
James	United Kingdom	The ship was wrecked near Maryport, Cumberland. She was on a voyage from Liverpool, Lancashire to Newcastle upon Tyne, Northumberland.
L'Emulation	France	The brig was abandoned in the English Channel 8 leagues (24 nautical miles (44 km)) south south west of The Lizard, Cornwall, United Kingdom. Her crew were rescued by Duke of Marlborough (United Kingdom. She was on a voyage from "Crequir" to Marseille, Bouches-du-Rhône.
Réunion	France	The ship was driven ashore and wrecked at Calais. Her crew were rescued by the Calais Lifeboat.
Thames	British East India Company	The East Indiaman was driven ashore at Eastbourne, Sussex with the loss of twelve of her 140 crew. She was on a voyage from London to China. Thames was refloated on 22 February and towed to Gravesend, Kent.

== 4 February ==
List of shipwrecks: 4 February 1822
Ship	State	Description
Martin	United Kingdom	The brig departed from Limerick for Greenock, Renfrewshire. No further trace, presumed foundered in the Irish Sea with the loss of all hands.
York	United Kingdom	The ship was wrecked in the Isles of Scilly with the loss of all hands. She was on a voyage from Seville, Spain to London.

== 5 February ==
List of shipwrecks: 5 February 1822
Ship	State	Description
Earl of Lonsdale	United Kingdom	The ship foundered off the Irish coast about this date, She was on a voyage from São Miguel, Azores, Portugal to Liverpool, Lancashire.
Flora	United States	The ship was driven ashore at Kilrush, County Clare, United Kingdom. She was on a voyage from Philadelphia, Pennsylvania to Limerick, United Kingdom.
Julian	United Kingdom	The ship was driven ashore at Hubberston Pill, Pembrokeshire.
Nancy	United Kingdom	The ship was driven ashore at Milford Haven, Pembrokeshire. She was on a voyage from Liverpool to Limerick. Nancy was refloated the next day.
Thalia	United States	The ship was driven ashore and wrecked at Crookhaven, County Cork, United Kingdom. She was on a voyage from Savannah, Georgia to Liverpool.
York	United Kingdom	The schooner was wrecked in the Isles of Scilly with the loss of all hands.

== 6 February ==
List of shipwrecks: 6 February 1822
Ship	State	Description
Anna Sophia	Sweden	The ship was driven ashore and wrecked on the Isle of Lewis, Outer Hebrides, United Kingdom. She was on a voyage from Stornoway, Isle of Lewis to Stockholm.
British Army	United Kingdom	The ship was wrecked in the Atlantic Ocean (48°43′N 26°00′W) with the ultimate loss of two of her seventeen crew. Survivors were rescued on 11 February by Rose (United Kingdom. British Army was on a voyage from Saint John, New Brunswick to Liverpool, Lancashire.
Earl Spencer	United Kingdom	The sloop was driven ashore and wrecked in Bigtown Bay, Shetland Islands with the loss of a crew member.
Homer	United Kingdom	The ship was driven ashore in the Clyde. She was on a voyage from Greenock, Renfrewshire to Savannah, Georgia, United States. Homer was refloated in late February and taken in to Greenock.
Mary	United Kingdom	The ship was driven ashore at Movelle, County Londonderry. She was on a voyage from Liverpool, Lancashire to Londonderry.
Tek Sing	China	The junk ran aground on a reef in the Gaspar Strait. She was on a voyage from Amoy to Batavia, Netherlands East Indies.

== 7 February ==
List of shipwrecks: 7 February 1822
Ship	State	Description
Fame	United Kingdom	The ship was driven ashore and wrecked on Lundy Island, Devon. Her crew were rescued, She was on a voyage from Bristol, Gloucestershire to Cork.
Lily	United Kingdom	The ship sprang a leak and foundered in the Atlantic Ocean 30 nautical miles (56 km) north west of Westport, County Mayo. Her crew survived. She was on a voyage from Limerick to Glasgow, Renfrewshire.
Minerva	United Kingdom	The ship was driven ashore at Solva, Pembrokeshire. She was on a voyage from Cork to Chepstow, Monmouthshire.
Ranter	United Kingdom	The ship was wrecked at Portpatrick, Wigtownshire. Her crew were rescued. She was on as voyage from Stranraer, Wigtownshire to Whitehaven, Cumberland.
Swift	United Kingdom	The ship was driven ashore at Solva. She was on a voyage from Newport, Monmouthshire to the Bristol Channel.

== 8 February ==
List of shipwrecks: 8 February 1822
Ship	State	Description
Elizabeth Johanna	Netherlands	The ship sank in the Atlantic Ocean off port Isaac, Cornwall, United Kingdom with the loss of two of the 40 people on board. She was on a voyage from Batavia, Netherlands East Indies to Rotterdam, South Holland.
Expedition	United Kingdom	The ship was driven ashore and wrecked at Carmarthen. She was on a voyage from Bristol, Gloucestershire to Carmarthen.
Medford	United States	The ship was driven ashore and wrecked at Saundersfoot, Pembrokeshire, United Kingdom. She was on a voyage from Baltimore, Maryland to Cork, United Kingdom.

== 9 February ==
List of shipwrecks: 9 February 1822
Ship	State	Description
Forest	United Kingdom	The brig struck the Runnel Stone and foundered. Her crew were rescued by David Waters (United Kingdom).
Mary Charlotte	(United Kingdom of Great Britain and Ireland) British North America	The ship was lost at Montego Bay, Jamaica. Her crew were rescued.
Sally and William	United Kingdom	The sloop was wrecked in Oxwich Bay.
Waterloo	United Kingdom	The ship was wrecked on Oronsay, Inner Hebrides with the loss of her captain. She was on a voyage from Liverpool, Lancashire to Mobile, Alabama, United States.

== 10 February ==
List of shipwrecks: 10 February 1822
Ship	State	Description
Norfolk	United Kingdom	The ship foundered in the Irish Sea off Troon Ayrshire.
Royal Oak	United Kingdom	The ship was driven ashore at Spurn Point, Yorkshire. She was on a voyage from South Shields, County Durham to London. Royal Oak was refloated on 13 February and taken in to Hull, Yorkshire.

== 11 February ==
List of shipwrecks: 11 February 1822
Ship	State	Description
Earl Lonsdale	United Kingdom	The ship foundered off Cape Clear Island, County Cork. She was on a voyage from São Miguel Island, Azores, Portugal to Liverpool, Lancashire.
Recovery	United Kingdom	The ship was driven ashore near Workington, Cumberland. She was on a voyage from Harrington, Cumberland to Liverpool, Lancashire.
Speedy Peace	United States	The ship was wrecked on the Bahama Bank. Her crew were rescued. She was on a voyage from Mobile, Alabama to New York.

== 12 February ==
List of shipwrecks: 12 February 1822
Ship	State	Description
Aurora	United Kingdom	The ship was driven ashore in Dundrum Bay. She was on a voyage from Liverpool, Lancashire to Dundalk, County Louth.

== 13 February ==
List of shipwrecks: 13 February 1822
Ship	State	Description
Noytgedagt	Netherlands	The ship ran aground off Dunkirk, Nord, France. She sank the next day. Noytgedagt was on a voyage from Ghent, East Flanders to Bayonne, Basses-Pyrénées, France.

== 14 February ==
List of shipwrecks: 14 February 1822
Ship	State	Description
Franciscus	Hamburg	The ship was captured by two pirate schooners off Cayo Confito, Cuba. She was subsequently driven ashore and wrecked at Minerva. Her crew survives. Franciscus was on a voyage from Hamburg to Havana, Cuba.
Mary	United Kingdom	The sloop was driven ashore at Fethard, County Wexford. Her crew were rescued. She was on a voyage from Cardiff, Glamorgan to Ross.
May Flower	United Kingdom	The ship was severely damaged by fire at North Shields, County Durham.

== 15 February ==
List of shipwrecks: 15 February 1822
Ship	State	Description
Mars	United Kingdom	The ship ran aground at New Orleans, Louisiana, United States. She was on a voyage from New Orleans to Havre de Grâce, Seine-Inférieure, France.
Mary Ann	United States	The ship was wrecked on Dutch Island, Rhode Island. She was on a voyage from Amsterdam, North Holland, Netherlands to Providence, Rhode Island.

== 16 February ==
List of shipwrecks: 16 February 1822
Ship	State	Description
Bee	United Kingdom	The ship was driven ashore at Campbeltown, Argyllshire. She was on a voyage from Irvine, Ayrshire to Dublin.
Mary	United Kingdom	The ship was driven ashore and wrecked at Mockbeggar, Cheshire. She was on a voyage from Sligo to Preston, Lancashire.
Moffatt	British East India Company	The East Indiaman ran aground on the Blacktail Sand, off the north Kent coast. She was on a voyage from Bengal, India to London. Moffatt was refloated and resumed her voyage.

== 17 February ==
List of shipwrecks: 17 February 1822
Ship	State	Description
Alfred	United Kingdom	The ship sprang a leak and was beached at Hubberston Pill, Pembrokeshire, where she sank. She was on a voyage from Cardiff, Glamorgan to London

== 19 February ==
List of shipwrecks: 19 February 1822
Ship	State	Description
Sophia	United Kingdom	The ship was wrecked on Grenada. She was on a voyage from Tobago to New Brunswick, British North America.
Waterloo	United Kingdom	The brig was wrecked on Oronsay, Inner Hebrides with the loss of her captain. She was on a voyage from Liverpool, Lancashire to Mobile, Alabama, United States.

== 20 February ==
List of shipwrecks: 20 February 1822
Ship	State	Description
Earl of Lonsdale	United Kingdom	The ship departed from São Miguel Island, Azores, Portugal for Liverpool, Lancashire. No further trace, presumed foundered with the loss of all hands.

== 21 February ==
List of shipwrecks: 21 February 1822
Ship	State	Description
Nile	United States	The ship was driven ashore and wrecked at Long Branch, New Jersey. She was on a voyage from Port-au-Prince, Haiti to New York. Nile was refloated on 6 March and arrived at New York on 20 March.
Zelle	France	The ship was lost near "Toraveja" with the loss of a crew member. She was on a voyage from Marseille, Bouches-du-Rhône to Havre de Grâce, Seine-Inférieure.

== 22 February ==
List of shipwrecks: 22 February 1822
Ship	State	Description
Nonsuch	United Kingdom	The ship collided with Trusty (United Kingdom) and foundered in the North Sea with the loss of five lives. Nonsuch was on a voyage from Leith, Lothian to Newcastle upon Tyne, Northumberland.
Queen	United Kingdom	The ship was lost near Placentia, Newfoundland. British North America Her crew were rescued. She was on a voyage from Dominica to Liverpool, Nova Scotia, British North America.
Wilhelmina Scott	United Kingdom	The ship was driven ashore and wrecked at Maryport, Cumberland. She was on a voyage from Whitehaven, Cumberland to Douglas, Isle of Man.

== 23 February ==
List of shipwrecks: 23 February 1822
Ship	State	Description
Duke of Wellington	United Kingdom	The ship was driven ashore in Sheephaven Bay. She was on a voyage from Liverpool, Lancashire to Westport, County Mayo.
Edward	United Kingdom	The ship was run down and sunk in the North Sea off Bridlington, Yorkshire by Margaret and Ann (United Kingdom). Her crew were rescued by Margaret and Ann.

== 25 February ==
List of shipwrecks: 25 February 1822
Ship	State	Description
Eagle	United Kingdom	The ship was driven ashore and damaged at Brielle, South Holland, Netherlands. She was on a voyage from Rotterdam, South Holland to London. Eagle was refloated on 1 March and put back to Rotterdam.
Voltaire	Netherlands	The ship was wrecked on Texel, North Holland. Her crew were rescued.

== 26 February ==
List of shipwrecks: 26 February 1822
Ship	State	Description
Charles	(United Kingdom of Great Britain and Ireland) British North America	The ship foundered in St. Mary's Bay. Her crew were rescued. She was on a voyage from Saint John, New Brunswick to Jamaica.
Hannah	United Kingdom	The ship was driven ashore near Wells-next-the-Sea, Norfolk.
Providence	United Kingdom	The ship was driven ashore near Wells-next-the-Sea. She was later refloated and taken in to Wells-next-the-Sea.

== 28 February ==
List of shipwrecks: 28 February 1822
Ship	State	Description
Barnevelt	United Kingdom	The ship was driven ashore and wrecked at Whitby, Yorkshire. Her crew were rescued by the Whitby Lifeboat.
Elizabeth	United Kingdom	The ship was driven ashore and wrecked at Whitby. Her crew were rescued by the Whitby Lifeboat.
Sally and Ann	United Kingdom	The ship was destroyed by fire at Kippford, Dumfriesshire.

== Unknown date ==
List of shipwrecks: Unknown date in February 1822
Ship	State	Description
Alliance	United States	The brig was captured by pirates off Cape San Antonio, Cuba and was burnt. She was on a voyage from Port-au-Prince, Haiti to New Orleans, Louisiana.
Ann	United Kingdom	The ship was wrecked in the Abaco Islands before 21 February. She was on a voyage from Jamaica to Saint John, New Brunswick, British North America.
Frances	United Kingdom	The ship departed from Limerick for a port in Cumberland. No further trace, presumed foundered in the Irish Sea with the loss of all hands.
Galen	United States	The ship was driven ashore at the Tybee Island Lighthouse, Georgia. She was on a voyage from Charleston, South Carolina, to Cowes, Isle of Wight, United Kingdom.
Hawker	United Kingdom	The ship was abandoned in the Atlantic Ocean. Her crew were rescued by Bainbridge (United Kingdom). She was on a voyage from Saint John, New Brunswick, British North America to Liverpool, Lancashire.
James	United Kingdom	The ship was driven ashore at "Burran Point". She was on a voyage from Liverpool to Glasgow, Renfrewshire.
Jean	United Kingdom	The ship was driven ashore near Ravenglass, Cumberland.
Martha	Russia	The ship was lost off Mandal, Norway.
Nelly	United Kingdom	The ship was driven ashore at Ayr. She was on a voyage from Newry, County Antrim to Ayr.
Neptune	France	The ship foundered off Barcelona, Spain with the loss of all but one of her crew. She was on a voyage from Cette, Hérault to Rouen, Seine-Inférieure.
Paquete de Madeira	Portugal	The ship was lost at Vigo, Spain. She was on a voyage from Madeira to Porto.
Peperboom	Norway	The ship was driven ashore at Kirkwall, Orkney Islands, United Kingdom in early February.
Sophia	United Kingdom	The ship was lost near Heligoland with the loss of all hands. She was on a voyage from Hamburg to London.
Victory	United Kingdom	The ship departed from Bristol, Gloucestershire for Liverpool. No further trace, presumed foundered in the Irish Sea with the loss of all hands.
