= List of ships named British Army =

At least two Age of Sail merchant ships were named British Army for the British Army:

- British Army (1811 ship) was launched at Quebec. She traded across the Atlantic and to the East Indies. A wave wrecked her at sea in 1822 in the Atlantic.
- British Army, of 1,338 tons, was an iron-hulled barque launched at Sunderland in 1869 as Cynric. She was last listed in Lloyd's Register in 1890/91.
