= Ong Soo Hin =

Ong Soo Hin is a Malaysian businessman and head of a salvaging company in south-east Asia.

He was born to Chinese parents in Malaysia. He was business partners with marine salvor Mike Hatcher.

In 1996, Ong Soo Hin teamed up with Oxford University archaeologist Mensun Bound to work with Vietnam's National History Museum in excavating the Hoi An Wreck site off the coast of Hoi An, Vietnam. The project took four years and cost an estimated $14 million. Over 250,000 intact examples of Vietnamese ceramic were recovered.
