= Vũng Tàu shipwreck =

Shipwreck in the South China Sea

The Vũng Tàu shipwreck is a shipwreck that was found in the South China Sea off the islands of Côn Đảo about 100 nautical miles (185 km; 115 mi) from Vũng Tàu, Vietnam. The wreck was of a lorcha boat—a vessel with Cantonese/Chinese and Portuguese/European influences that has been dated to about 1690. It was found by a fisherman who had picked up numerous pieces of porcelain from the wreck while fishing. Sverker Hallstrom identified the wreck and its cargo in 1990. Australian diver Michael Flecker took charge of the archaeological aspect of the excavation. An analysis of its cargo deduced that the ship was bound from China to Jakarta, Indonesia, where the porcelain would have been purchased by the Dutch East India Company for trans-shipment to Holland.

== Cargo ==
A total of 48,288 items of fine Qing dynasty blue-and-white porcelain from Jingdezhen and other artifacts were recovered. These included bamboo combs, inkwells, tweezers, dice, and dishes. Christie's, the British auction house, selected 28,000 pieces of porcelain for auction in Amsterdam in 1992. The auction house sold the porcelain for a total of US$7.3 million. The Vũng Tàu Museum in Vietnam houses a representative sample of all the artifacts. The remainder of the ceramics were divided between Hallstrom and the Vietnamese government.

== See also ==
- Archaeology of shipwrecks
- Hội An wreck
- Junk rig
- Marine salvage
- Tek Sing
