= Vietnamese ceramics =

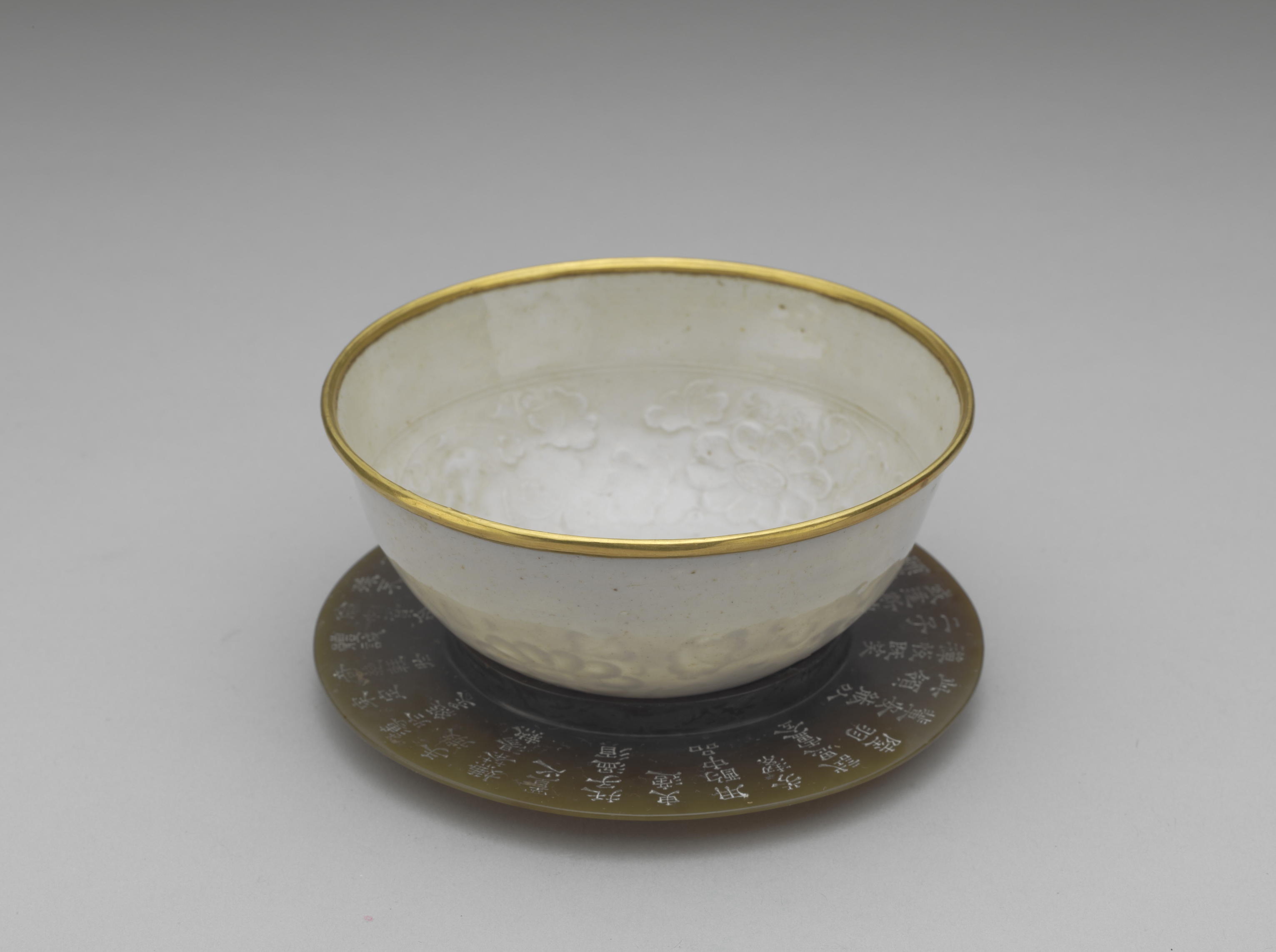
Teacup impressed with chrysanthemum decoration in white glaze, with a body thin enough to transmit light. Fashioned in the 15th century under the Lê dynasty, it later entered the Chinese imperial collection, and was misidentified by the Emperor Qianlong as Ming dynasty ware. Currently housed at the National Palace Museum, Taipei.

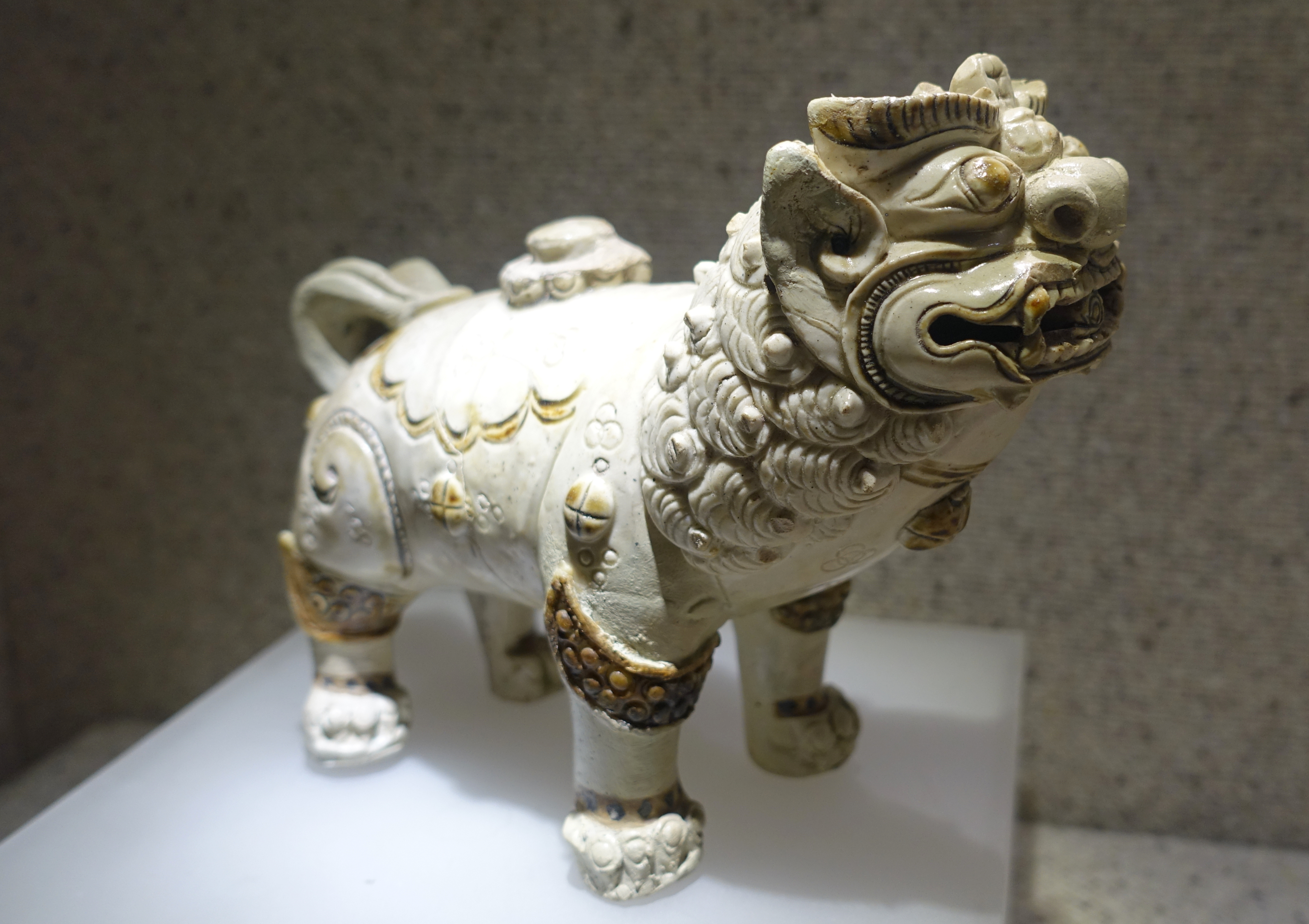
Narasimha figure, Lý dynasty, 11th century AD

Vietnamese ceramics refers to ceramic art and pottery as a form of Vietnamese art and industry. Vietnamese pottery and ceramics has a long history spanning back to thousands of years ago, including long before Chinese domination, as archeological evidence supports.

Much of Vietnamese pottery and ceramics after the Chinese-domination era was largely influenced by Chinese ceramics, but has developed over time to be distinctly Vietnamese. Vietnamese potters combined indigenous and Chinese elements. They also experimented with both original and individual styles as well as incorporated features from other cultures, such as Cambodia, India and Champa.

Vietnamese ceramics were an essential part of the trade between Vietnam and its neighbors during pre-modern times through all the periods.

== History ==
=== Neolithic ===
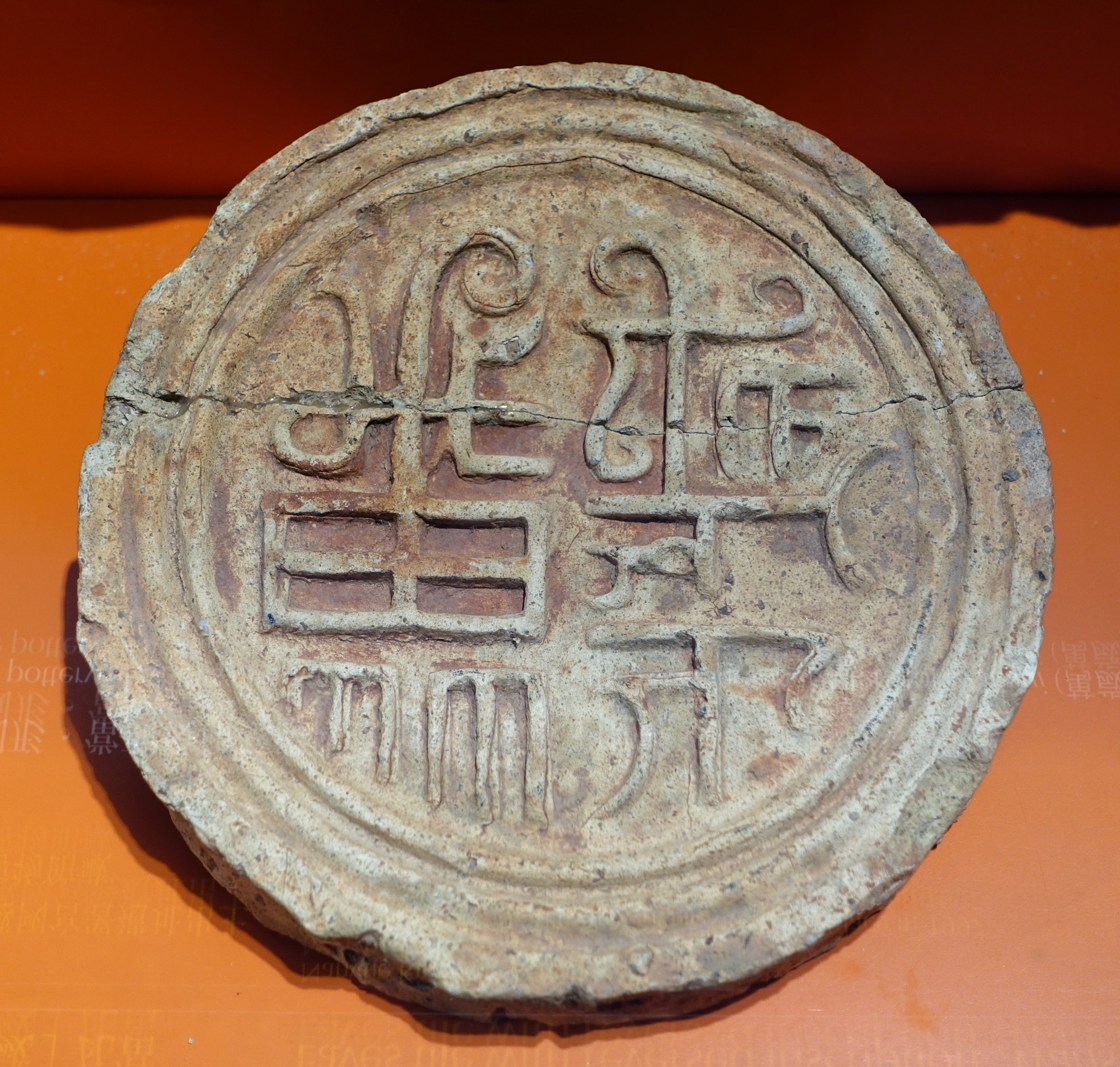
Ceramic eaves tile with reversed inscription "vạn tuế" (longevity) from the site of Nanyue Kingdom Palace, c. 207–111 BCE

The early Luo Yue ceramics has dominated aboriginal characteristics of Dongsonian culture.

=== Chinese domination ===
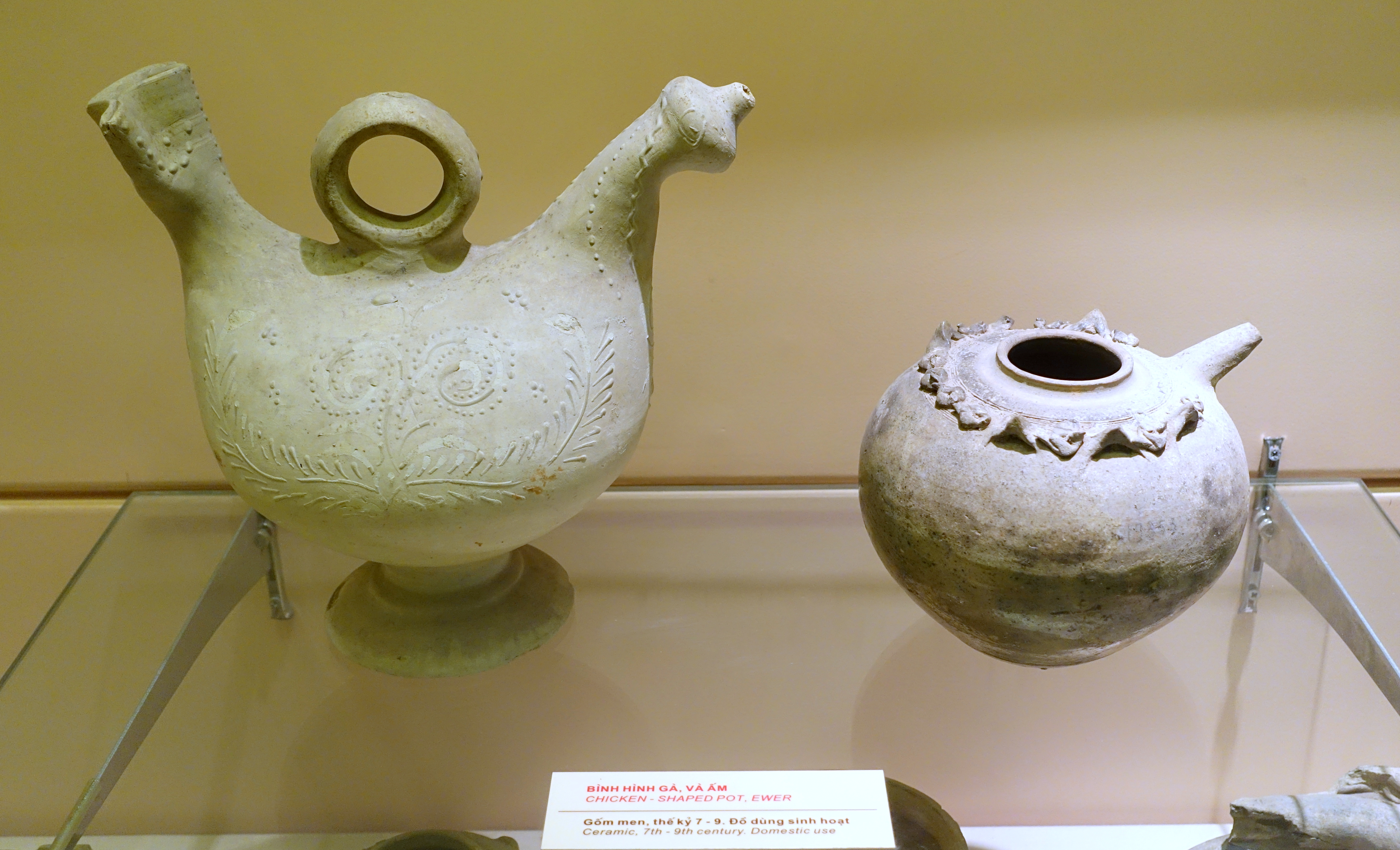
Yue porcelains in North Vietnam, 7th–9th century

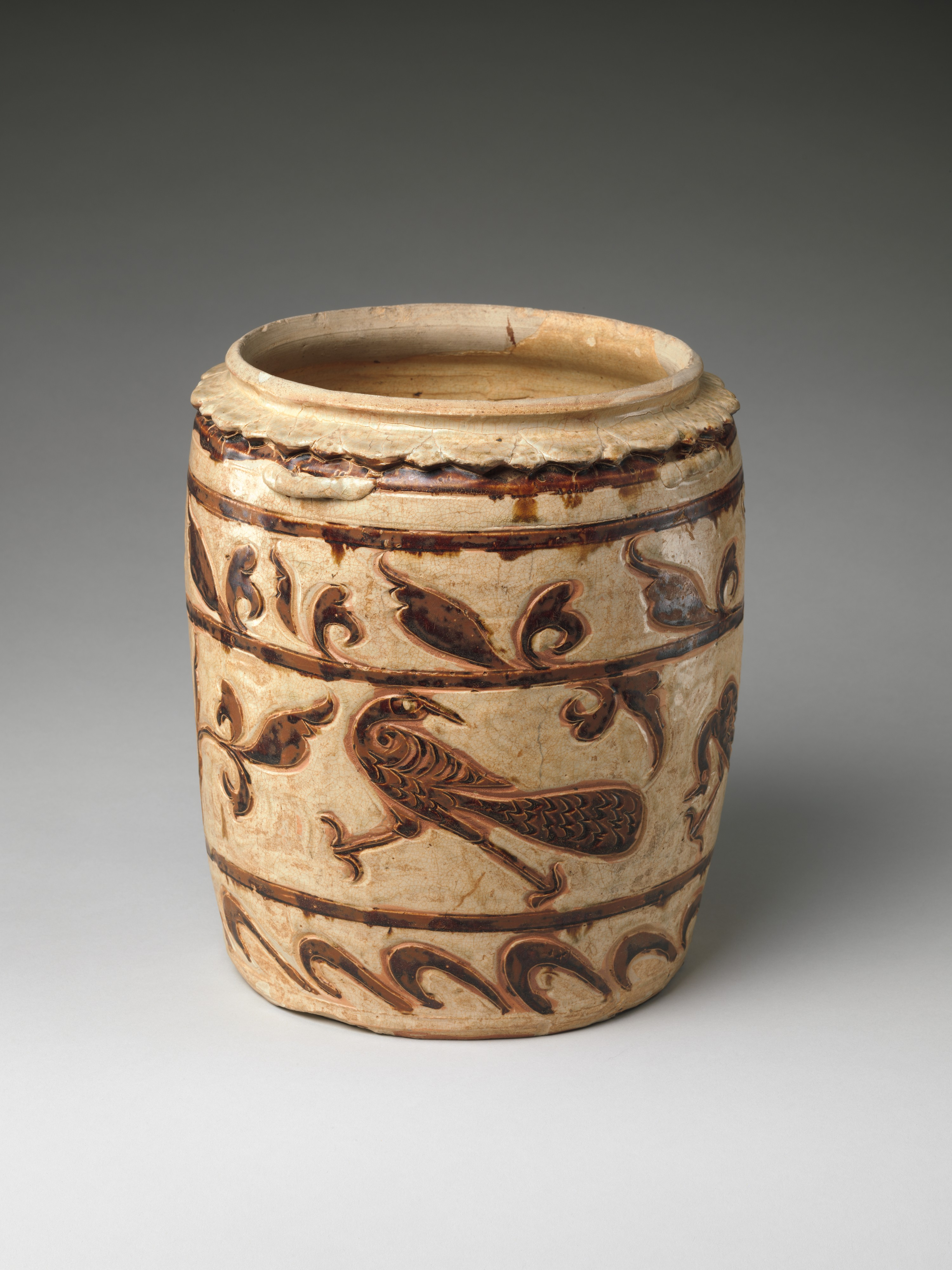
White-brown porcelain, 12th–13th century

During the Chinese domination periods, the local Dong Son culture started fading away and Vietnamese ceramics were being influenced by Chinese ceramics.

=== Classical period ===
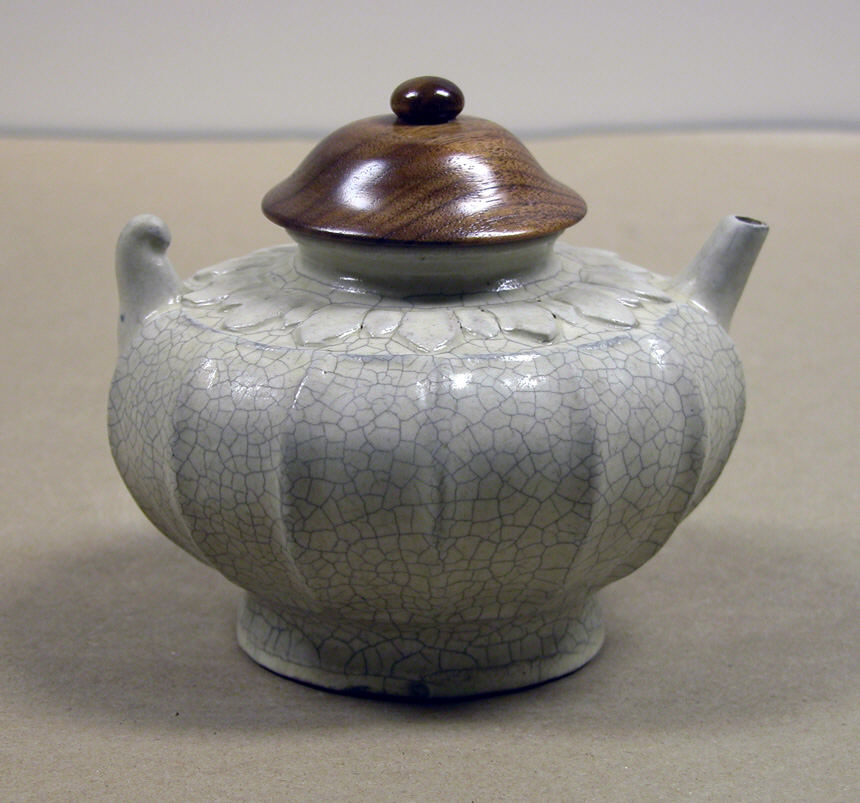
Creamy-white celadon teapot, 11th–12th century

After reclaiming independence from China in 938, the Vietnamese craftsman under sovereign royal rules began designing and manufacturing ceramic productions independently of China. Vietnamese Lý-Trần period's creamy-white celadon and white-brown gốm hoa nâu ceramics have local characteristics and are distinctly different from Chinese ceramics. Dragon "Nāga" decoration and motif became common during the Ly period, and appeared on steles, ceramics, along with Bodhi leaf, lotus, water, makara (मकर) and Buddha. Cham script were inscribed on terracotta bricks used for constructing religious buildings.

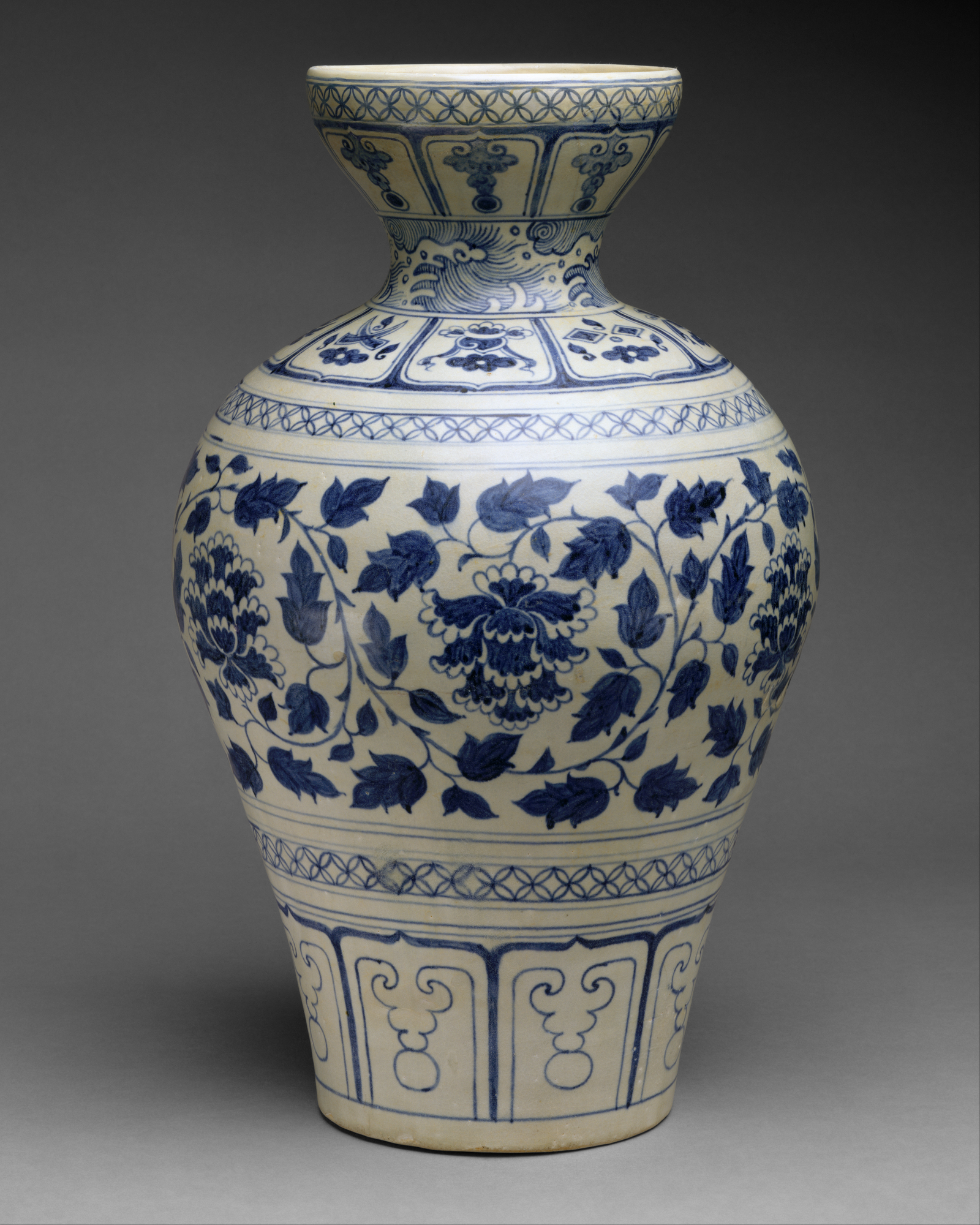
Blue and white jar from Chu Đậu kilns, 14th century

The Vietnamese had begun exporting their ceramic productions at least since late 13th century to 14th century. According to archaeological findings in Vietnam and other countries from the 14th century, some Vietnamese ceramics and coins dated 1330 have been recovered from the sites in Japan, the Philippines, and Indonesia.

During the 15th-century Chinese occupation of Vietnam, Vietnamese potters readily adopted cobalt underglaze, which had already gained popularity in export markets. Vietnamese blue-and-white wares sometimes featured two types of cobalt pigment: Middle Eastern cobalt yielded a vivid blue but was more expensive than the darker cobalt from Yunnan, China.

During the 15th century, around 80% of Southeast Asian ceramic products imported to Trowulan, capital of Majapahit Empire were Vietnamese products, and 20% were Thai. In the Philippines, Vietnamese ceramics comprise 1.5–5% of ceramics found on the archipelago, while accounting for 20-40% ofThai ceramics. Vietnamese ceramics also made up a small quantity in the 15th-century West Asian market.

=== Modern ===
While ceramic wares in the traditional style are still being produced and enjoy popularity, modern ceramics are increasingly produced for export. Ceramic production centers include Lái Thiêu in southern Vietnam.

One of the noteworthy examples of modern ceramic art is the Hanoi Ceramic Mosaic Mural, which is affixed on the wall of the dyke system of Hanoi. With a length of about 4 km, the Ceramic Road is one of the major projects that were developed on the occasion of the Millennial Anniversary of Hanoi.

== Cát Tiên ==
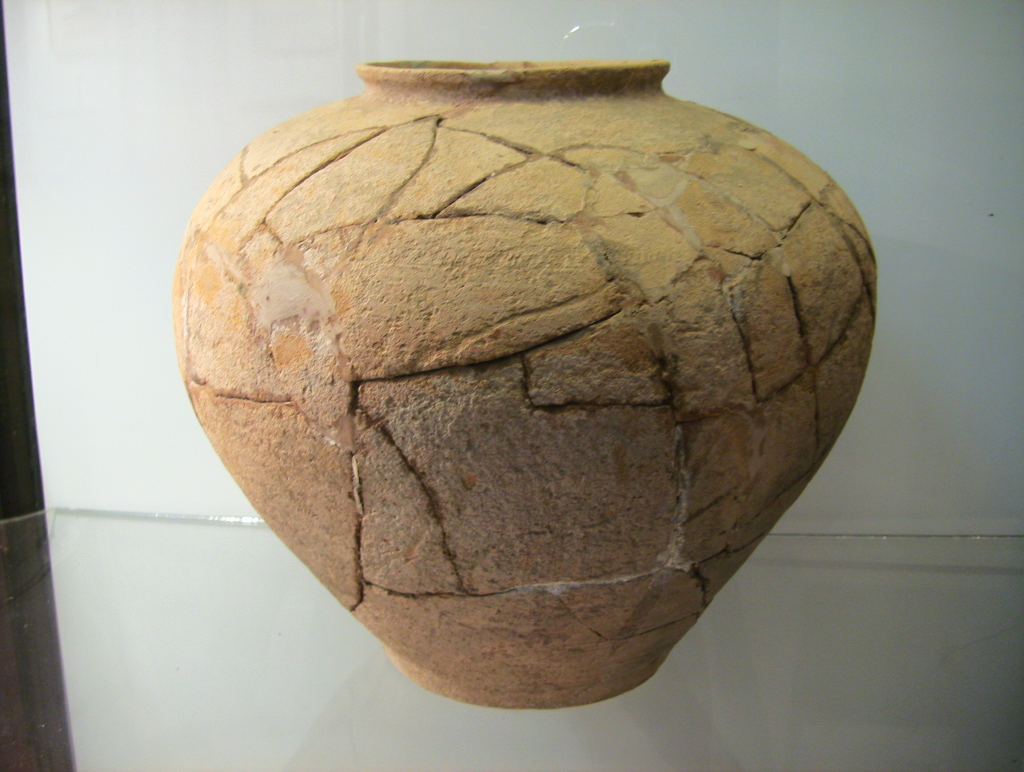
Mộ vò gốm, a ceramic burial jar from Cát Tiên in south Vietnam, 4th–9th century CE

The Cát Tiên archaeological site in south Vietnam is site located in Cát Tiên National Park. Accidentally discovered in 1985, this site ranges from Quảng Ngãi Commune to Đức Phổ Commune, with the main archaeological artefacts concentrating in Quảng Ngãi, Cát Tiên District, Lâm Đồng Province, southern Tây Nguyên. The unknown civilization which developed this site inhabited it between the 4th century and 9th centuries CE. A number of ceramic wares were found at this site.

== Bát Tràng ==
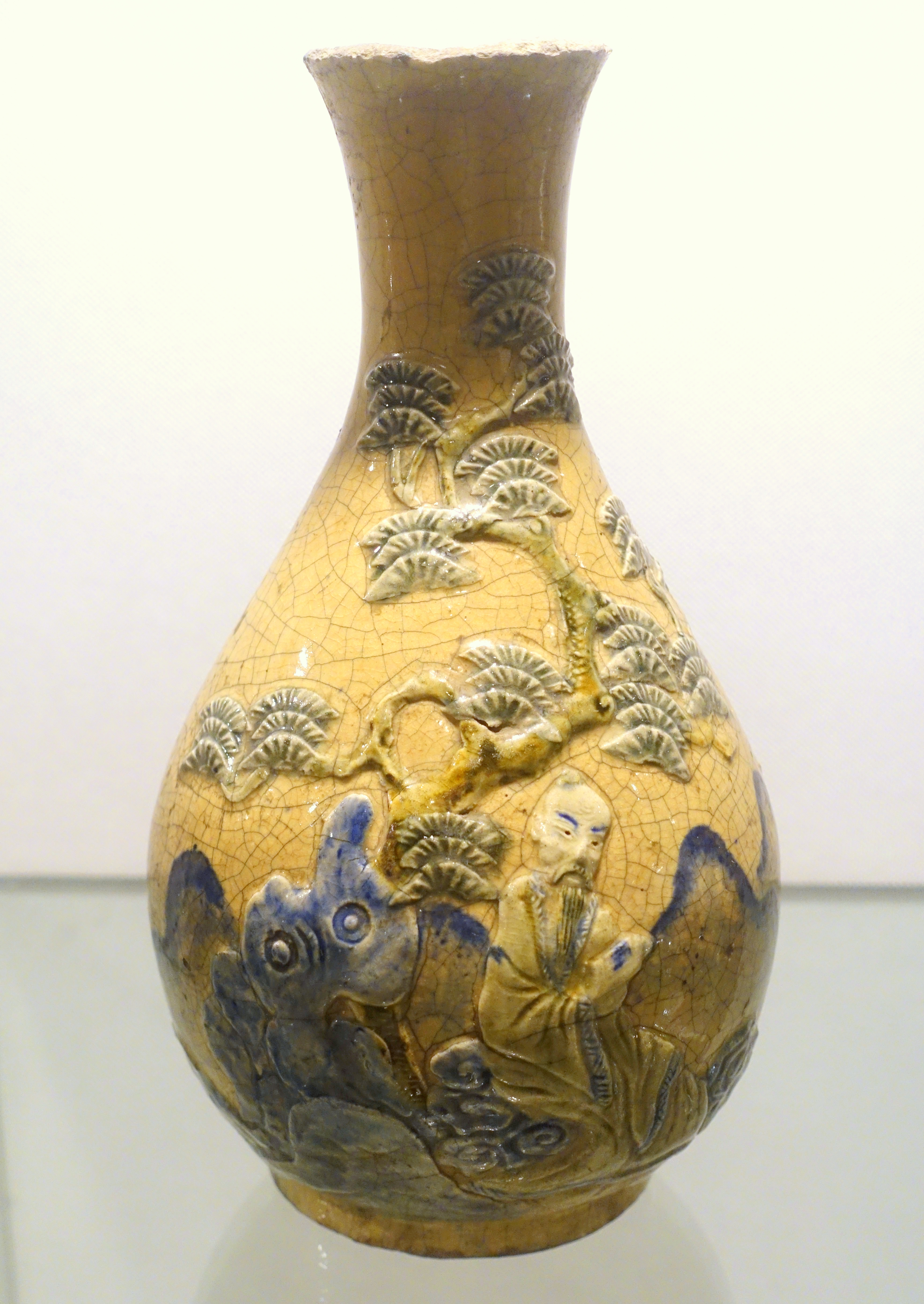
Crackled polychrome glaze pot from Bát Tràng, Nguyễn dynasty period, 19th century

Bát Tràng porcelain and pottery is a type of ceramics made in the village of Bát Tràng, now merged into suburban Hanoi. The earliest refer of Bát Tràng kilns was in 1352. The village is located in an area rich in clay suitable for making fine ceramic. Bát Tràng ceramics were esteemed with products rivaling that of Chu Đậu, and later joined by pottery from Đồng Nai, Phu Lang, and Ninh Thuận. The history of pottery production in the village can be traced back as far as the 14th century CE, and in subsequent centuries having been a popular manufactured product extensively traded by local merchants as well as European trading ships throughout Southeast Asia and the Far East. Bát Tràng nowadays still continues producing bowls, dishes and vases not only for the local market but also for exporting to Japan, one of the important market of Vietnamese ceramics. The gas kiln is more and more popular than electric or tradition wooden kiln. Beside the traditional decoration technique by brush, it appears recently the decoration technique using screen printing on rice paper. The new technique is applied mainly for the producing religious products like incense burners. But all other processes of making vessels are still very much handmade which is very important. There is another beautiful thing of Bát Tràng that is the old family houses. It is left only two or three this kind of old house which still keep the spirit of old Bat Trang, where it is found the big size vases, or bowls with the decorations from the 14th century, the most popular period of Bat Trang Ceramics.

There are a number of private museums inside Bat Trang including Bat Trang Museum of Viet soul art and Center of Vietnam Quintessential Handicraft

== Chu Đậu ==
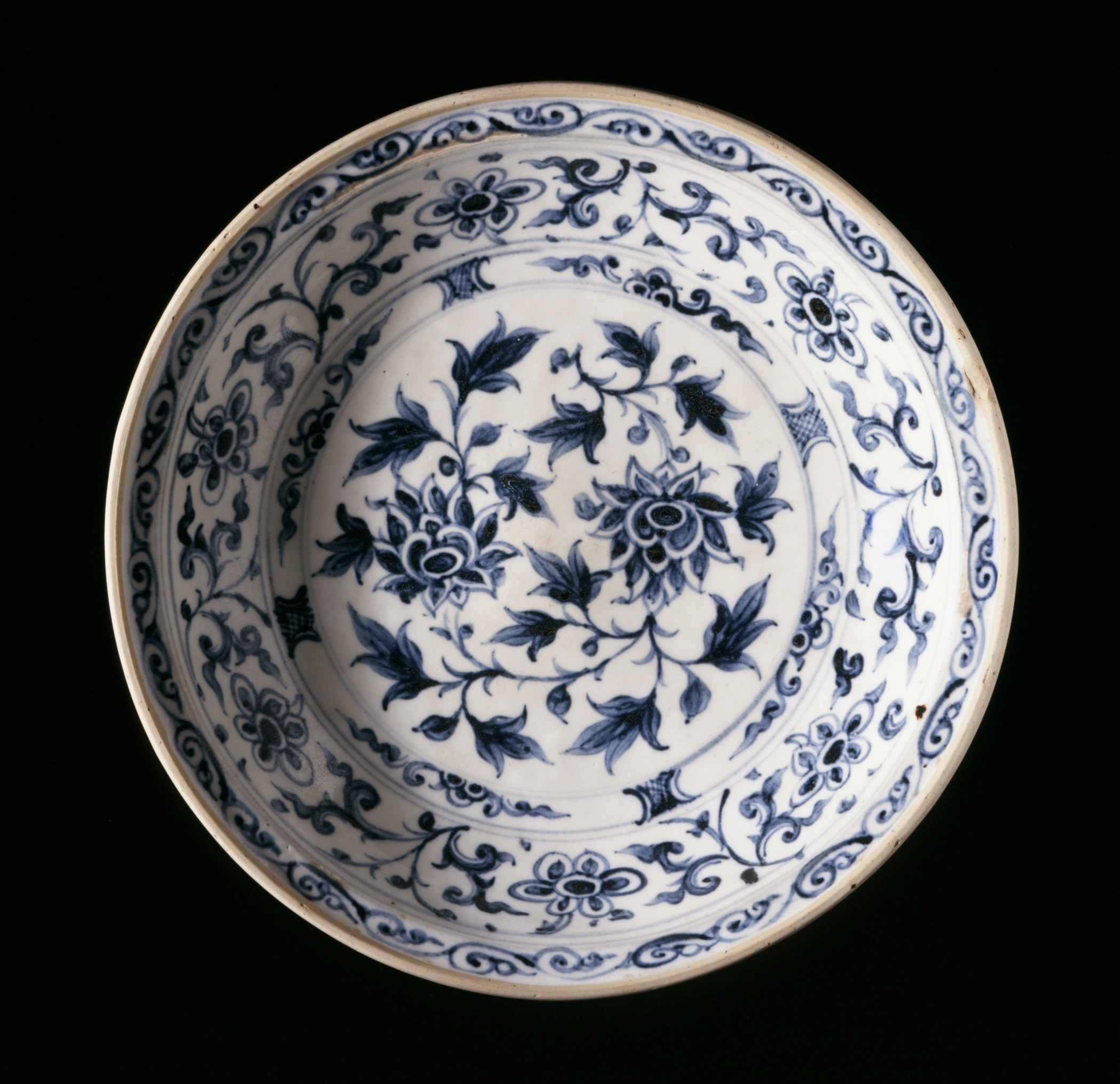
Blue-white dish, from Chu Đậu kiln, Lê Nhân Tông, 1450–1460

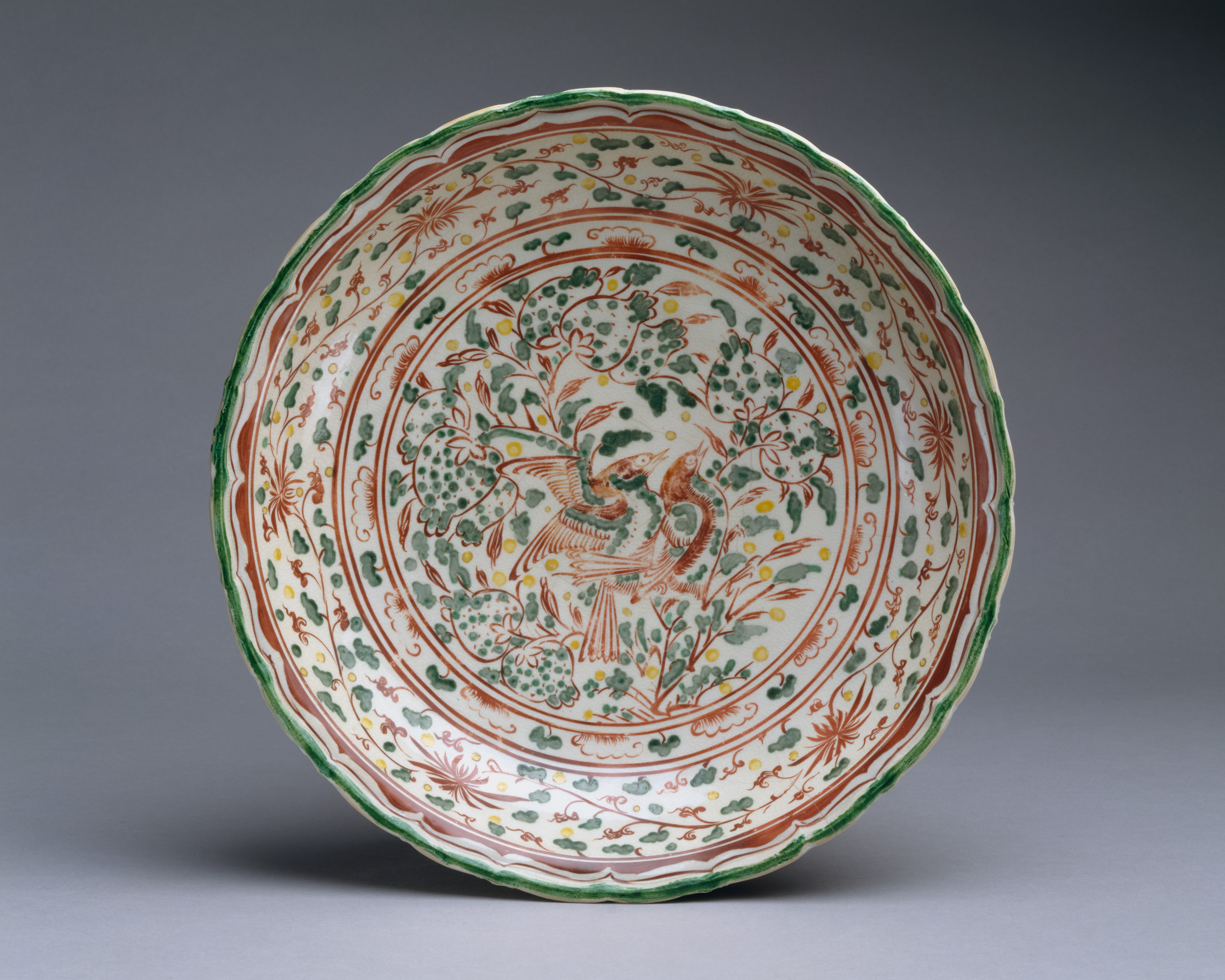
Chu Dau dish decorated with pomegranate tree and songbirds, 15th century

Chu Đậu ceramics, in the Nam Sách county east of Hanoi, was discovered in 1983, which led to a series of excavations being conducted there from 1986 to 1991. The village is estimated to have begun production in the 13th century, reaching a peak in the 15th and 16th centuries, and declining in the 17th century. From 1436 to 1465, China's Ming dynasty abruptly ceased trade with the outside world, creating a commercial vacuum that allowed Vietnamese blue-and-white ceramics to monopolize the markets for about 150 years. Vietnamese wares of this era have been found all over Asia, from Japan, throughout Southeast Asia (Thailand, Indonesia, the Philippines), to the Middle East (the Arabian port of Julfar, Persia, Syria, Turkey, Egypt), and Eastern Africa (Tanzania).

This is the place which is mentioned in the famous vase signed by a woman named Bui and dated 1450 in the Topkapi Saray Museum, Istanbul.

Chu Đậu ceramics exported in Japan were called (An'nan) Annam wares. Chu Đậu ceramics also made the majority in the Hội An shipwreck.

=== An'nan ===
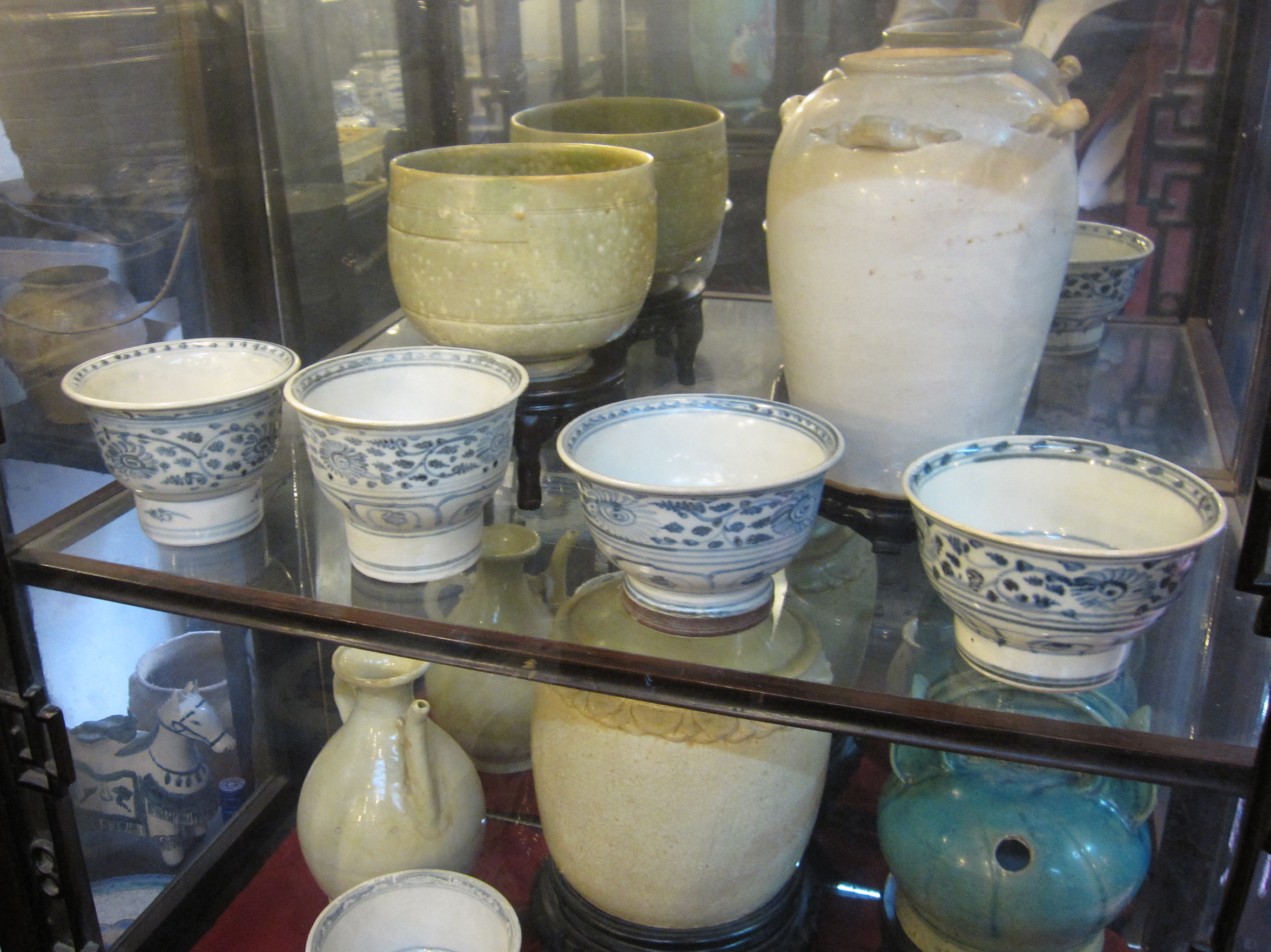
An'nan ware in blue and white

The trade in Vietnamese ceramics was damaged due to the plummet in trade by Cham merchants after the 1471 Vietnamese invasion of Champa. During the 16th century, Vietnam's export of ceramics was also damaged by its internal civil war, the Portuguese and Spanish entry into the region and the Portuguese conquest of Malacca which caused an upset in the trading system, while the carracks ships in the Malacca to Macao trade run by the Portuguese docked at Brunei due to good relations between the Portuguese and Brunei after the Chinese permitted Macao to be leased to the Portuguese.

Due to the so-called Nanban trade in the 16th–17th century, fragments of Vietnamese ceramic were found in a northern part of Kyūshū island. Among them was a wooden plate with character showing the date 1330 on it. Whether the Japanese went to Vietnam or Vietnamese traders came to Japan or if it all went through China is not quite clear. Vietnamese history records showed that when Lord Nguyễn Hoàng founded Hội An port at the beginning of the 17th century, hundreds of Japanese residents were already there.

One of the more famous items is An'nan wares (安南焼), which were exported to Japan and used in Japanese tea ceremony although the high-footed bowls were originally used for food. The bowls had an everted rim, high foot, were underglazed with cobalt floral decorations, lappets above base, unglazed stacking rings in well and were brown washed on the base. The diameters can range from 9 to 15 centimetres. They were produced in the 16th and 17th century.

=== Hội An wreck ===
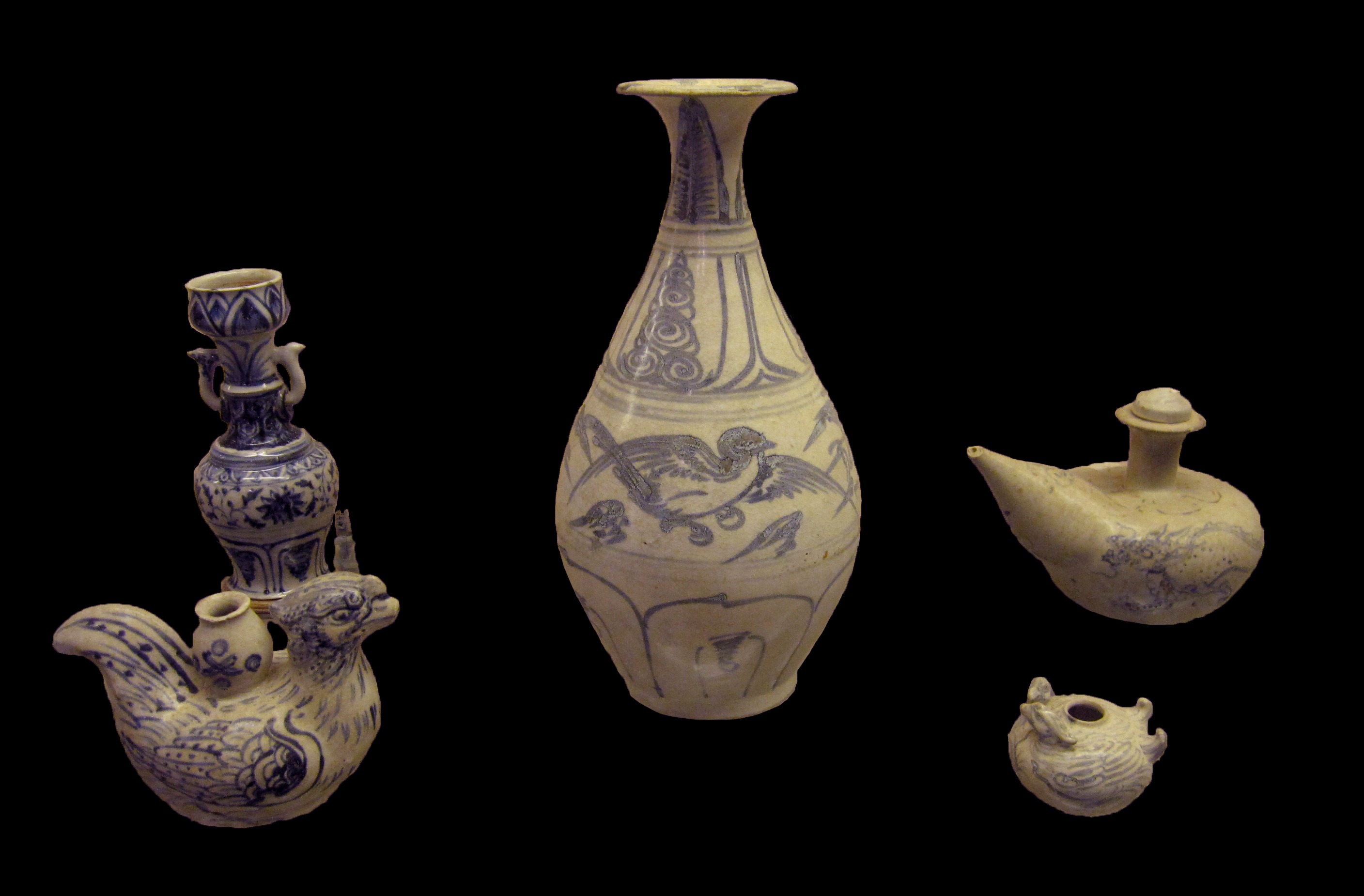
Blue-and-white ceramic lampstand, and phoenix-shaped vase ewers dated to the Later Lê dynasty, 15th century. Provenance Chu Đậu kiln, Hải Dương province.

The Hội An wreck lies 22 miles off the coast of central Vietnam in the South China Sea. The ship was carrying a large cargo of Vietnamese ceramics from the mid- to late-15th century. The provenance of the pieces was known to be the kilns of the Red River Delta (such as Chu Đậu) because excavations in the region had been ongoing since their discovery in 1983. The only pieces remaining at the kiln sites were wasters (pieces that had fused, collapsed or exploded in the firing process). Intact examples of the wares produced were rare, since all were exported. When the wreck was found there was excitement among collectors and archaeologists, for it promised the first cargo consisting solely of Vietnamese wares.

In 1996 over 250,000 intact examples of Vietnamese ceramic were recovered. 10% of unique ware was kept by the government for national museums, while the rest was allowed to be auctioned off to pay for recovery costs.

== Cham kilns (Go Sanh ceramics) ==
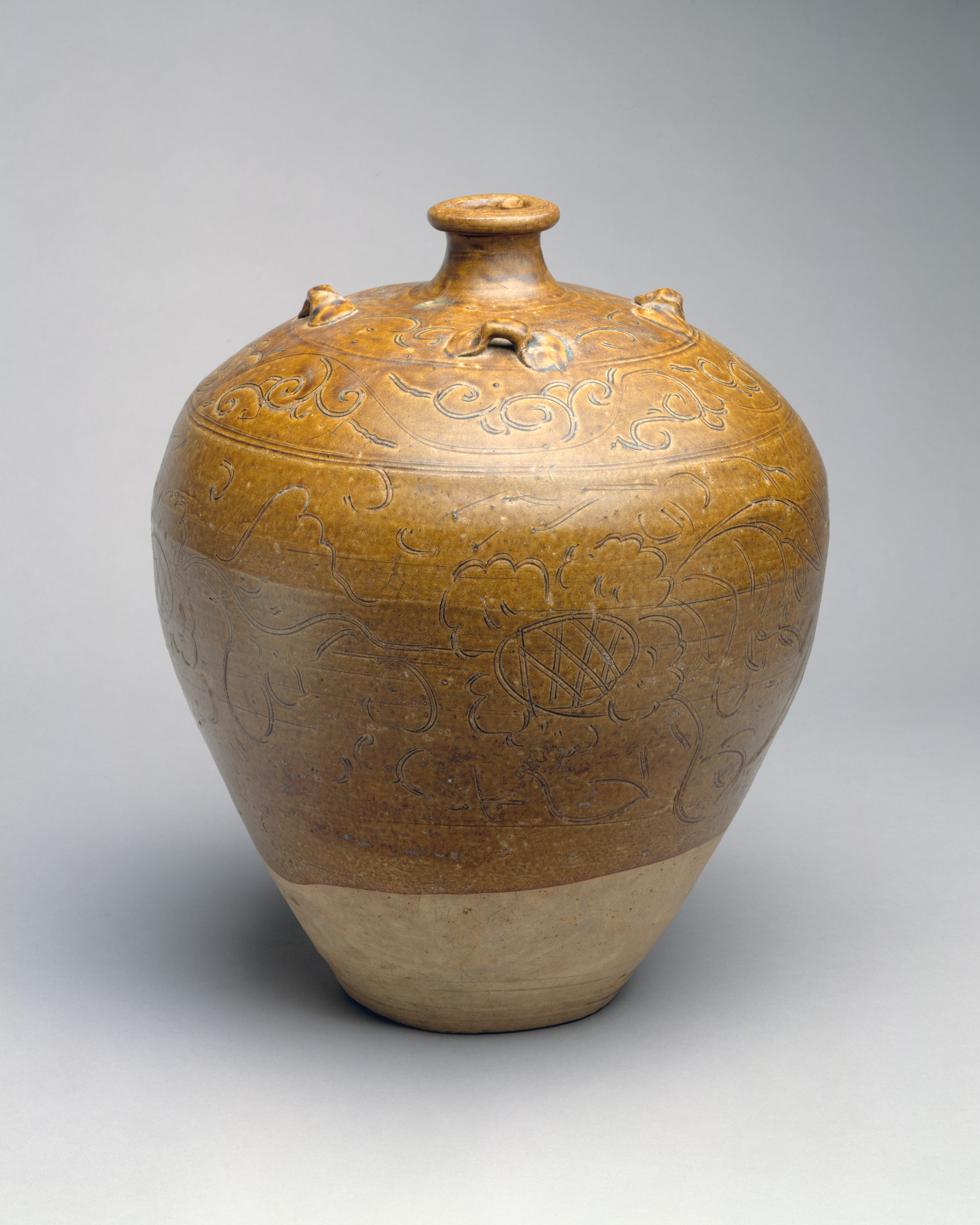
Cham-style stoneware jar, 15th–16th century

Cham kilns, locate in Go Sanh, Binh Dinh Province, modern-day central Vietnam, near the old Cham capital Vijaya, were 20 identified Champa kilns which were used to produce particularly Cham-style brown-glazed stoneware jars. The kilns were rebuilt many times, suggest a fairly long span of use. Go Sanh ceramics were found in Borneo, the Philippines and shipwrecks such as the Pandanan.

== Gallery ==
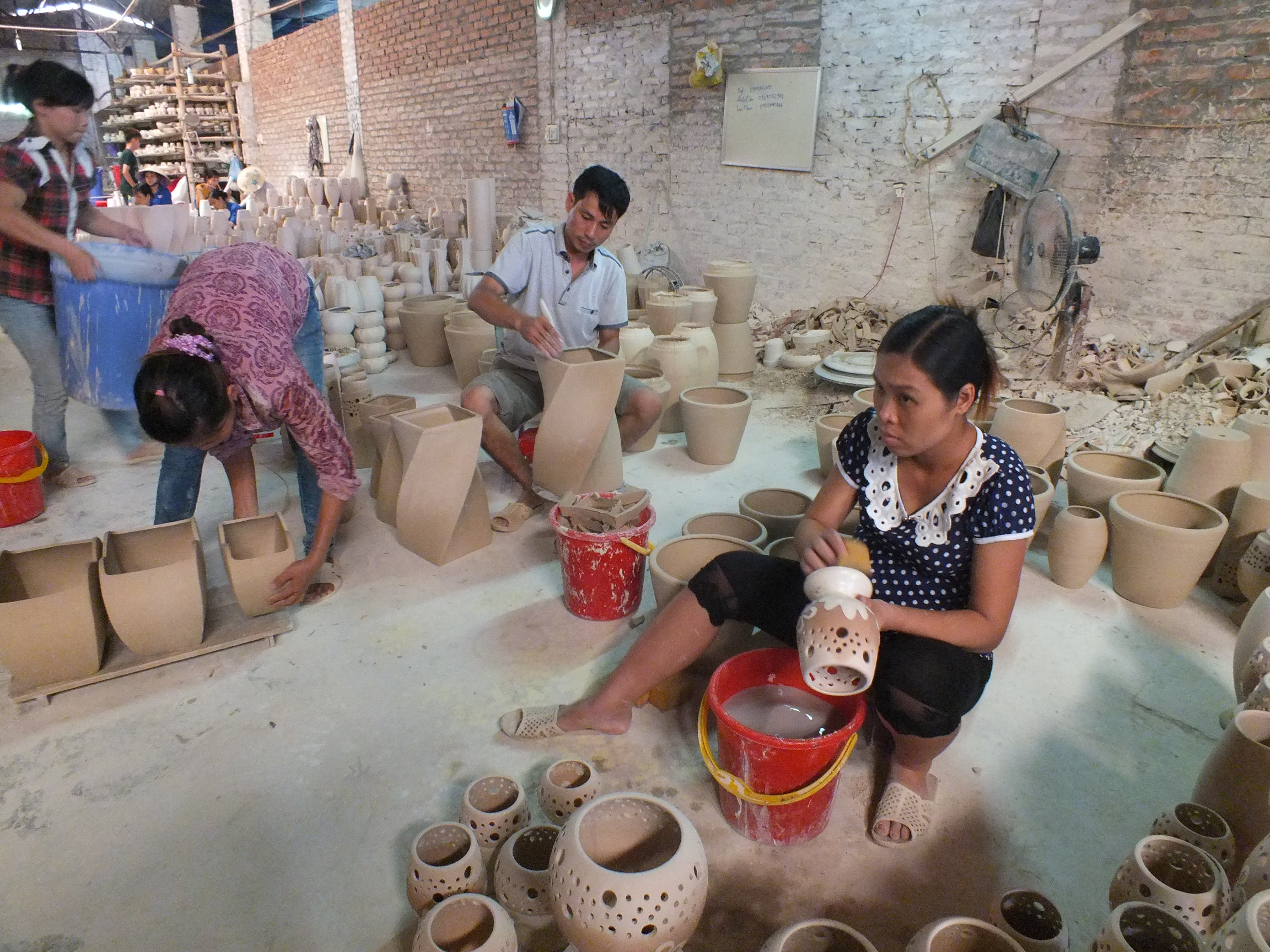
Hand crafting ceramics at Bat Trang, Vietnam

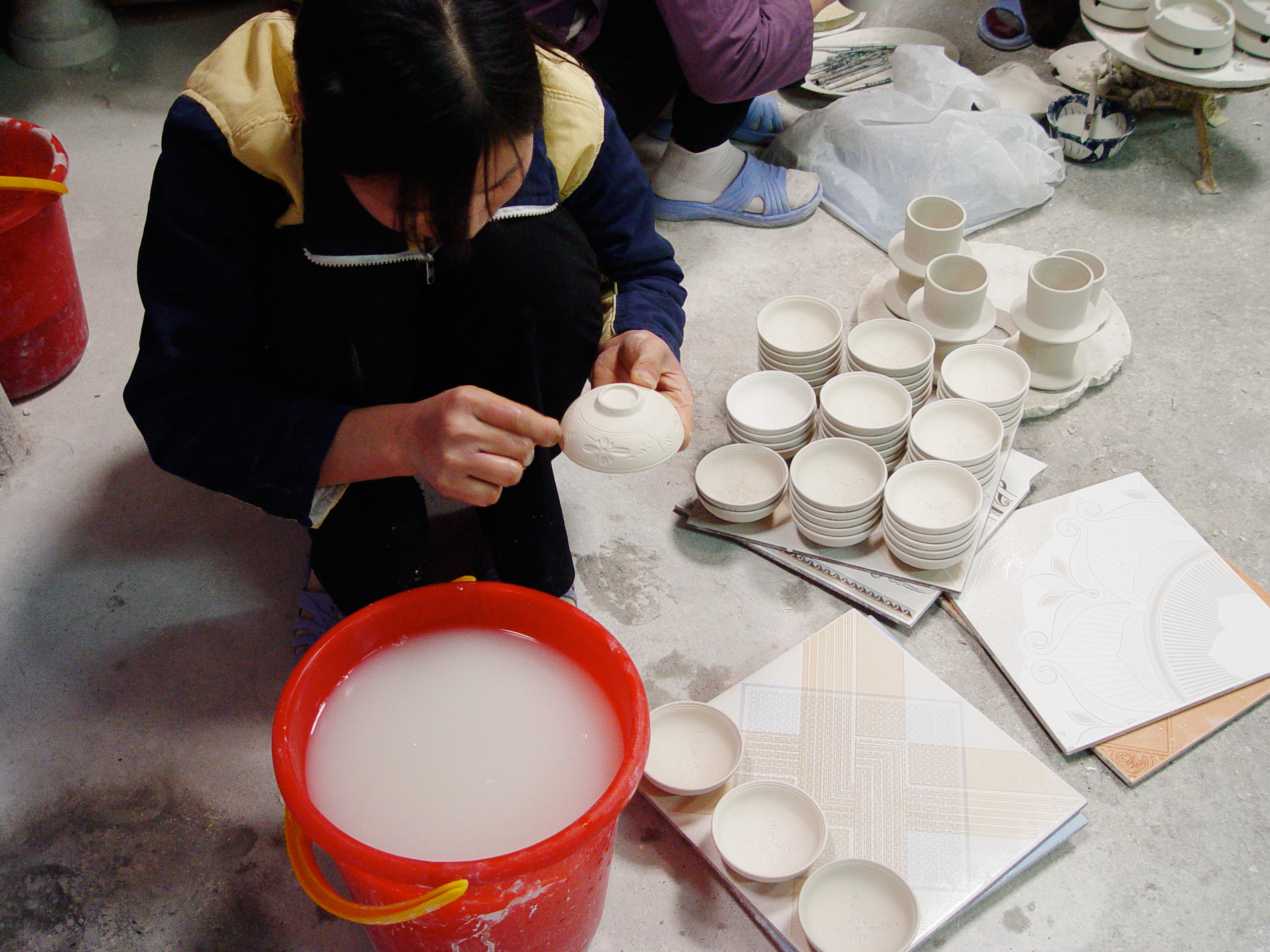
Hand crafting ceramics at Bat Trang, Vietnam

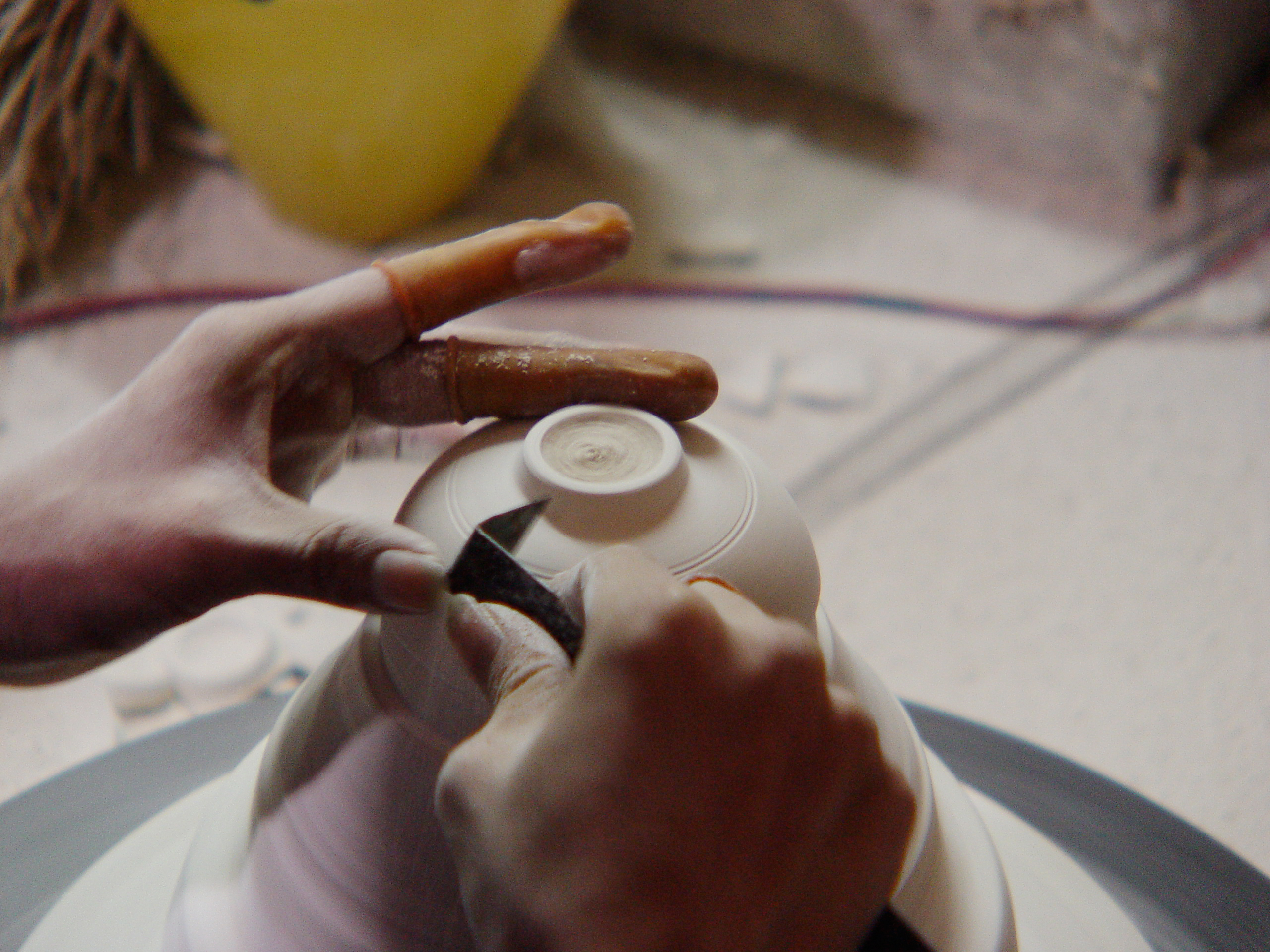
Hand crafting pottery in Bat Trang, Vietnam

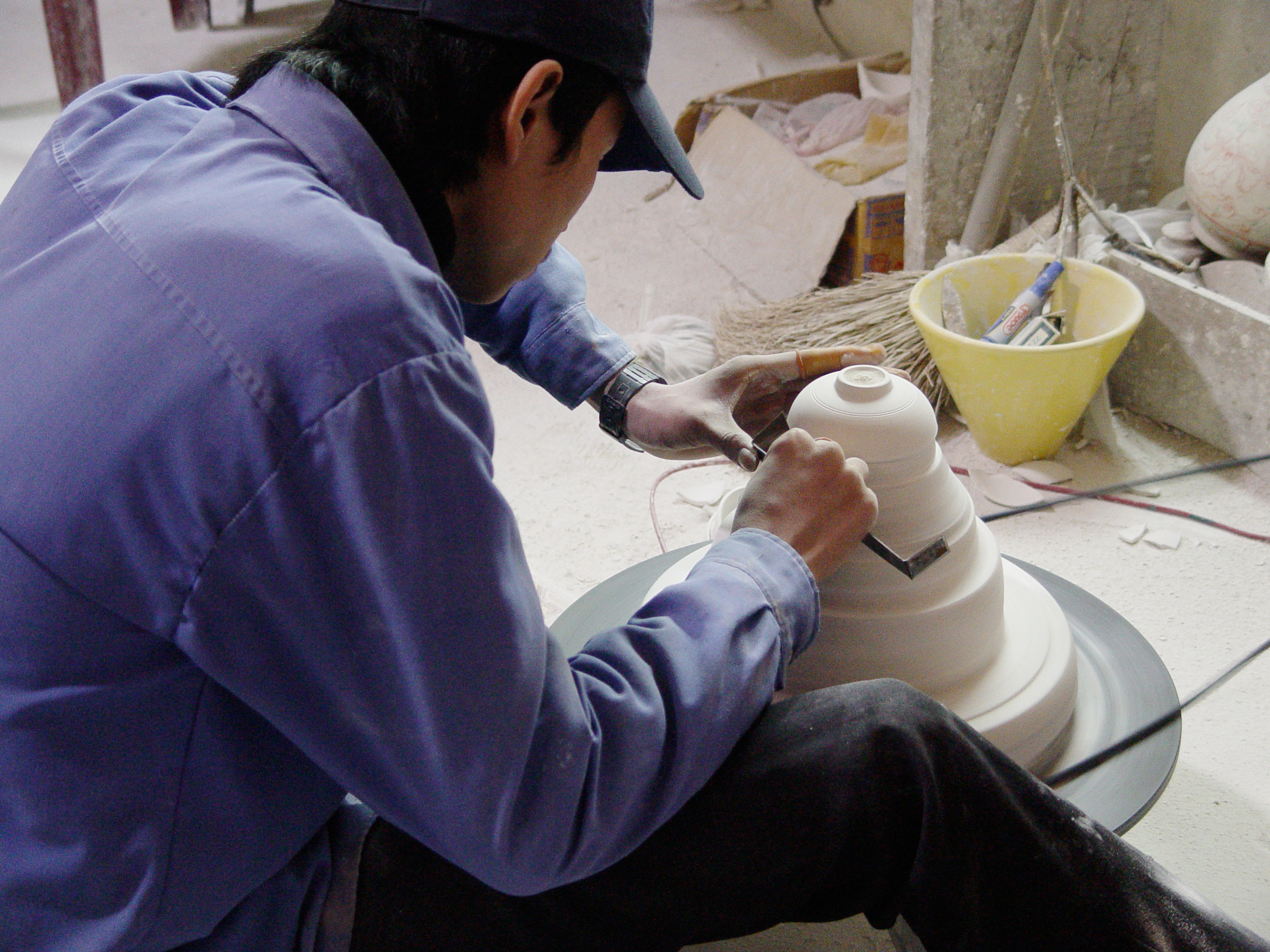
Hand crafting pottery in Bat Trang, Vietnam

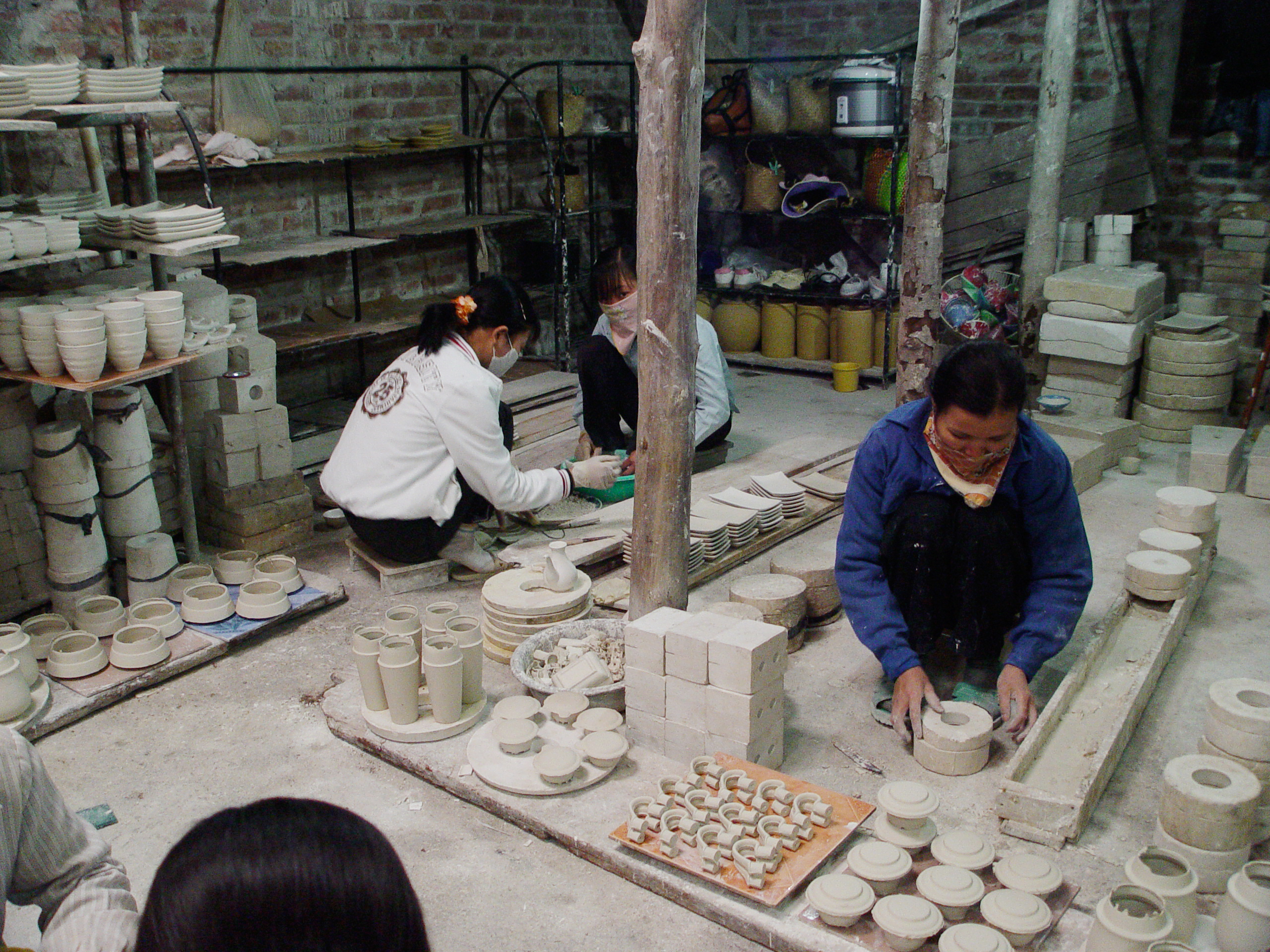
Hand crafting ceramics at Bat Trang, Vietnam

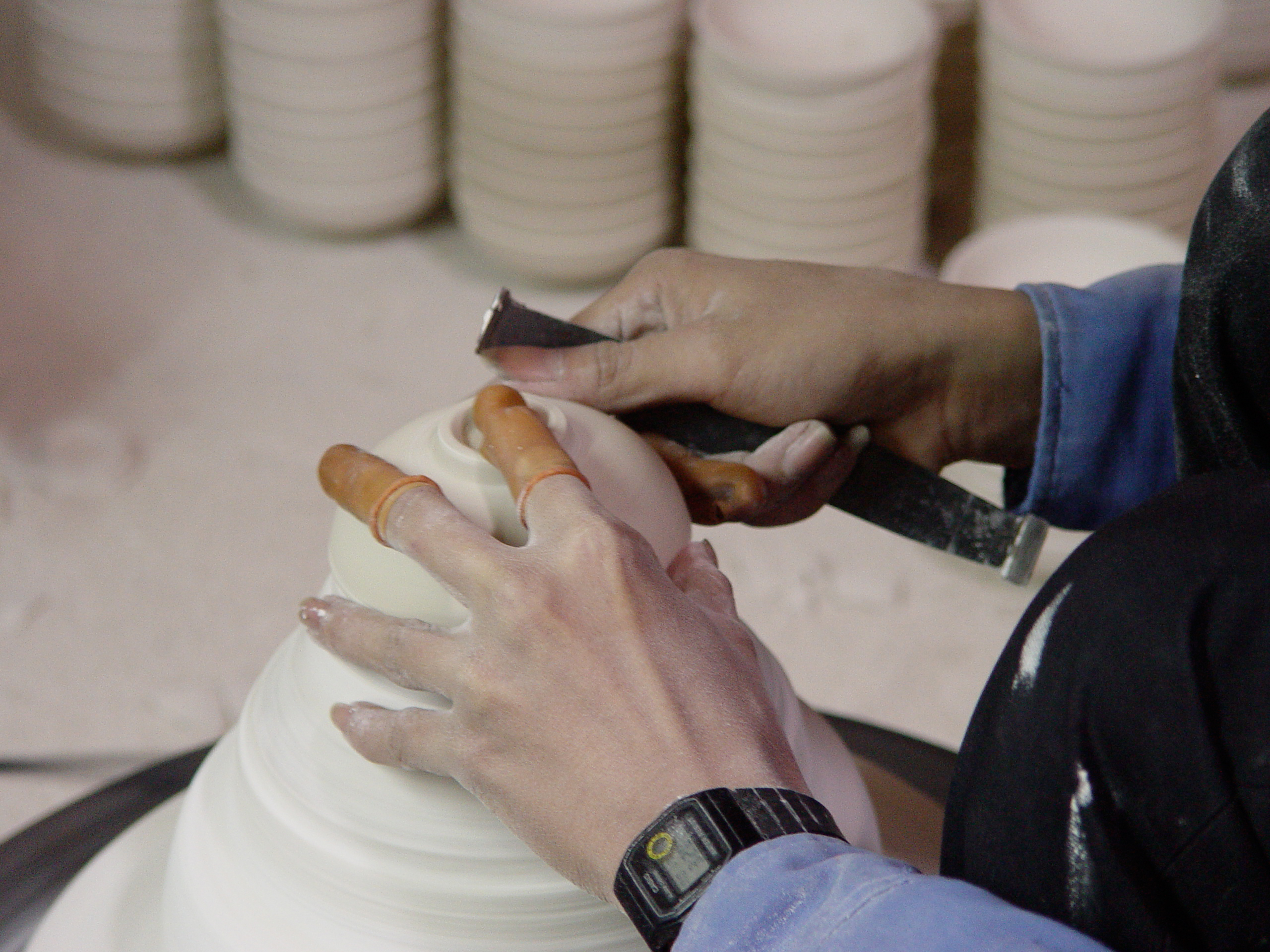
Hand crafting ceramics at Bat Trang, Vietnam

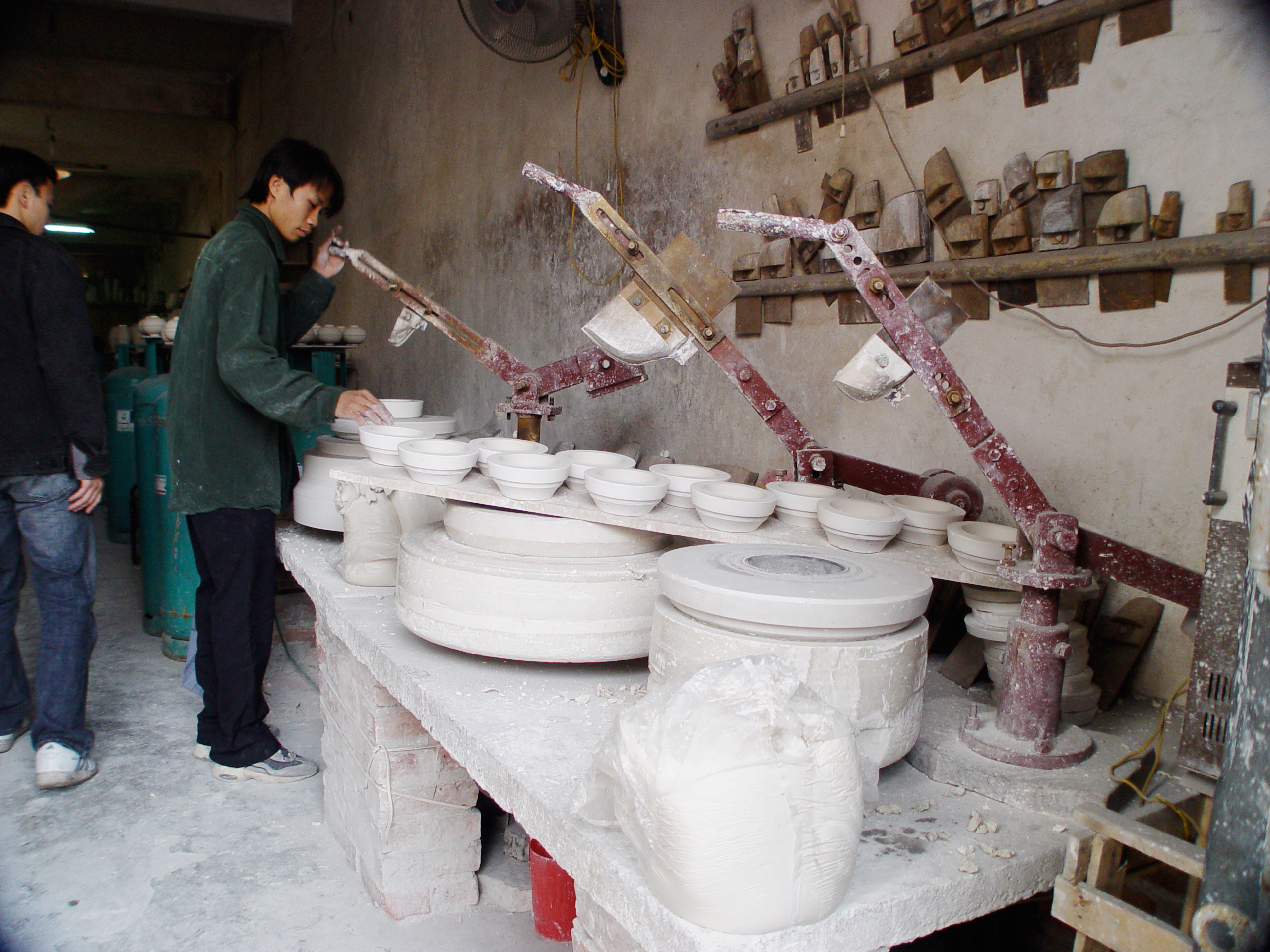
Hand crafting pottery in Bat Trang, Vietnam

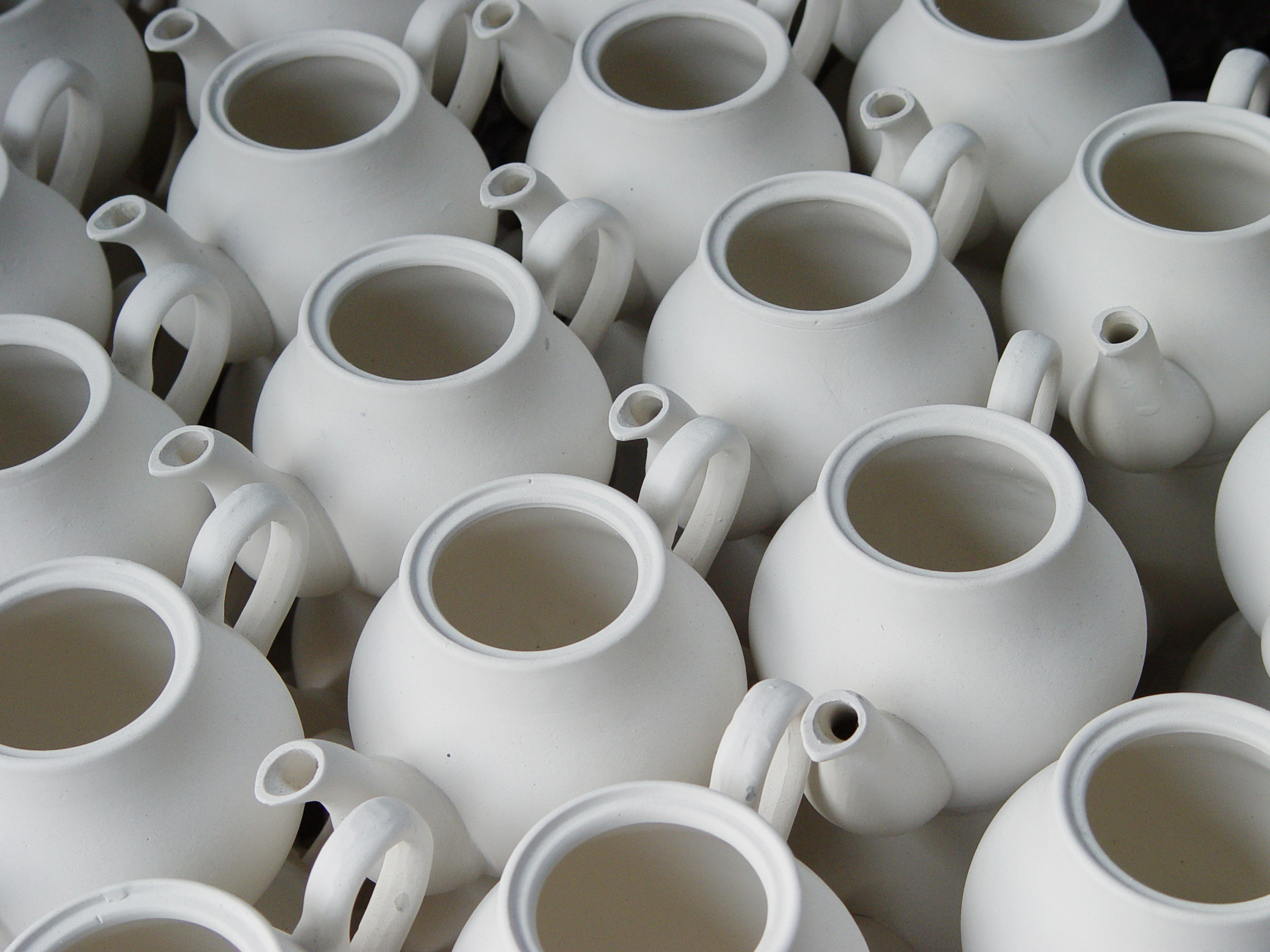
Ceramics at Bat Trang, Vietnam

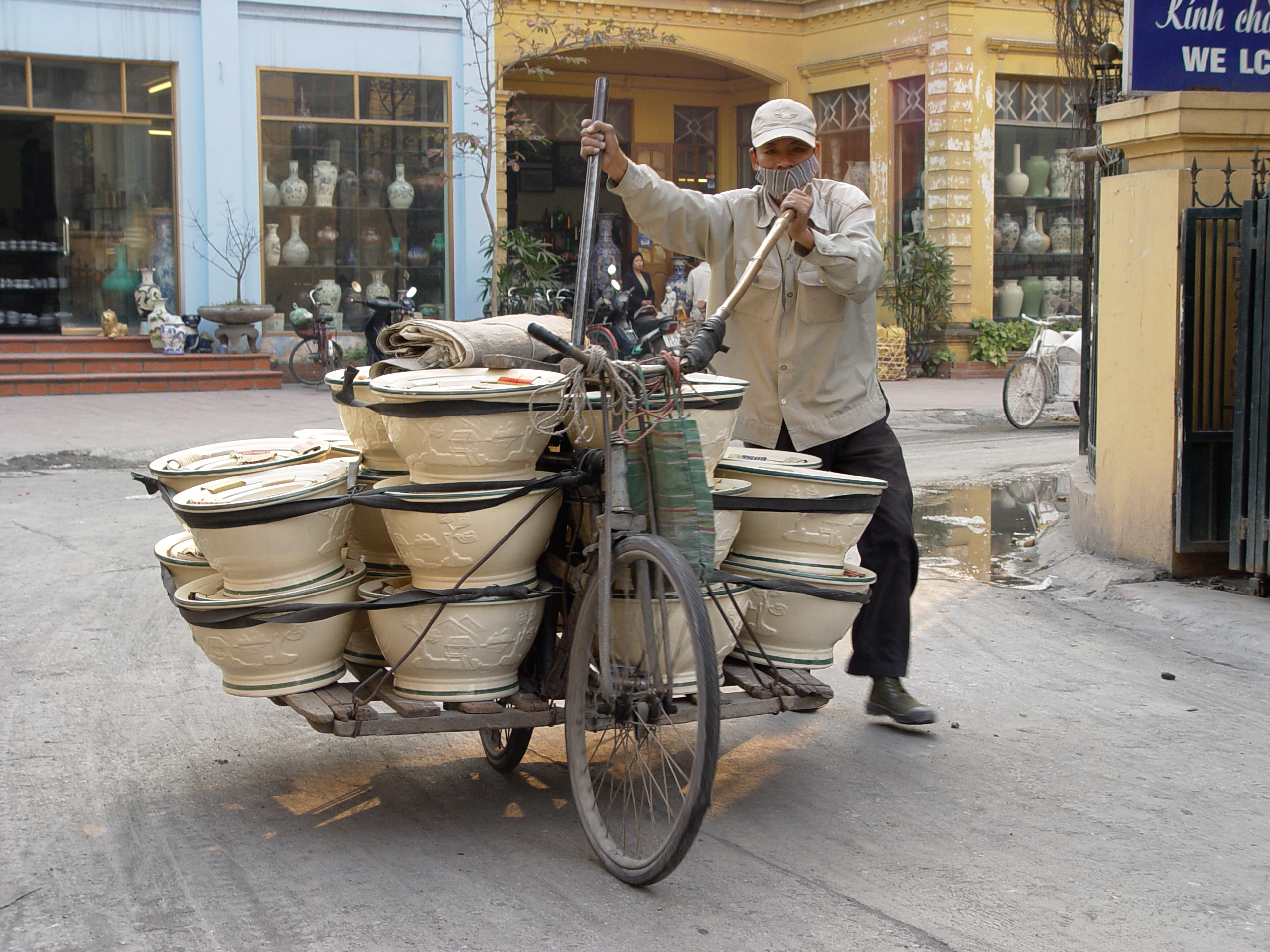
Transporting ceramics at Bat Trang, Vietnam

== See also ==
- Khmer ceramics
- Lao ceramics
- Philippine ceramics
- Thai ceramics
- Tapayan

== Sources ==
- Stevenson, John; Guy, John (1997). Vietnamese Ceramics: A Separate Tradition. Art Media Resources. ISBN 978-1-878529-22-0.
- Truong, Philippe (2008). The Elephant and the Lotus: Vietnamese Ceramics in the Museum of Fine Arts, Boston. MFA Publications. p. 272. ISBN 978-0-87846-717-4.
- Trương, Hạnh (2000). Vietnam Fine Arts Museum. Fine Arts Publishing House.
- Bùi, Minh Trí; Nguyễn, Kerry Long (2001). Vietnamese Blue & White Ceramics. Khoa học xã hội.
- Honda, Hiromu; Shimazu, Noriki (1993). Vietnamese and Chinese Ceramics Used in the Japanese Tea Ceremony. Oxford: Oxford University Press. p. 240. ISBN 978-0-19-588607-8.
- Tran, Khanh Chuong (2001). Gó̂m Việt Nam. Thế Giới Publishers.
- Tran, Khanh Chuong (2005). Vietnamese Ceramics. Hanoi: Thế Giới Publishers.
- Young, Carol (1982). Vietnamese Ceramics. Oxford: Oxford University Press.
- Li, Tana (2006), "The Rise and the Fall of the Jiaozhi Ocean Region", in Schottenhammer, Angela; Ptak, Roderich (eds.), The Perception of Maritime Space in Traditional Chinese Sources, Otto Harrassowitz Verlag, pp. 125–141
- Miksic, John (2009), Southeast Asian Ceramics: New Light on Old Pottery, Southeast Asian Ceramic Society
- Miksic, John Norman; Yian, Goh Geok (2016). Ancient Southeast Asia. Routledge.
- Miksic, John (2019), Sandhtakalaning Majapahit: Learning the Dynamics of Majapahit as Nusantara's great strength, Universitas Airlangga
