= Hội An wreck =

Shipwreck in the South China Sea

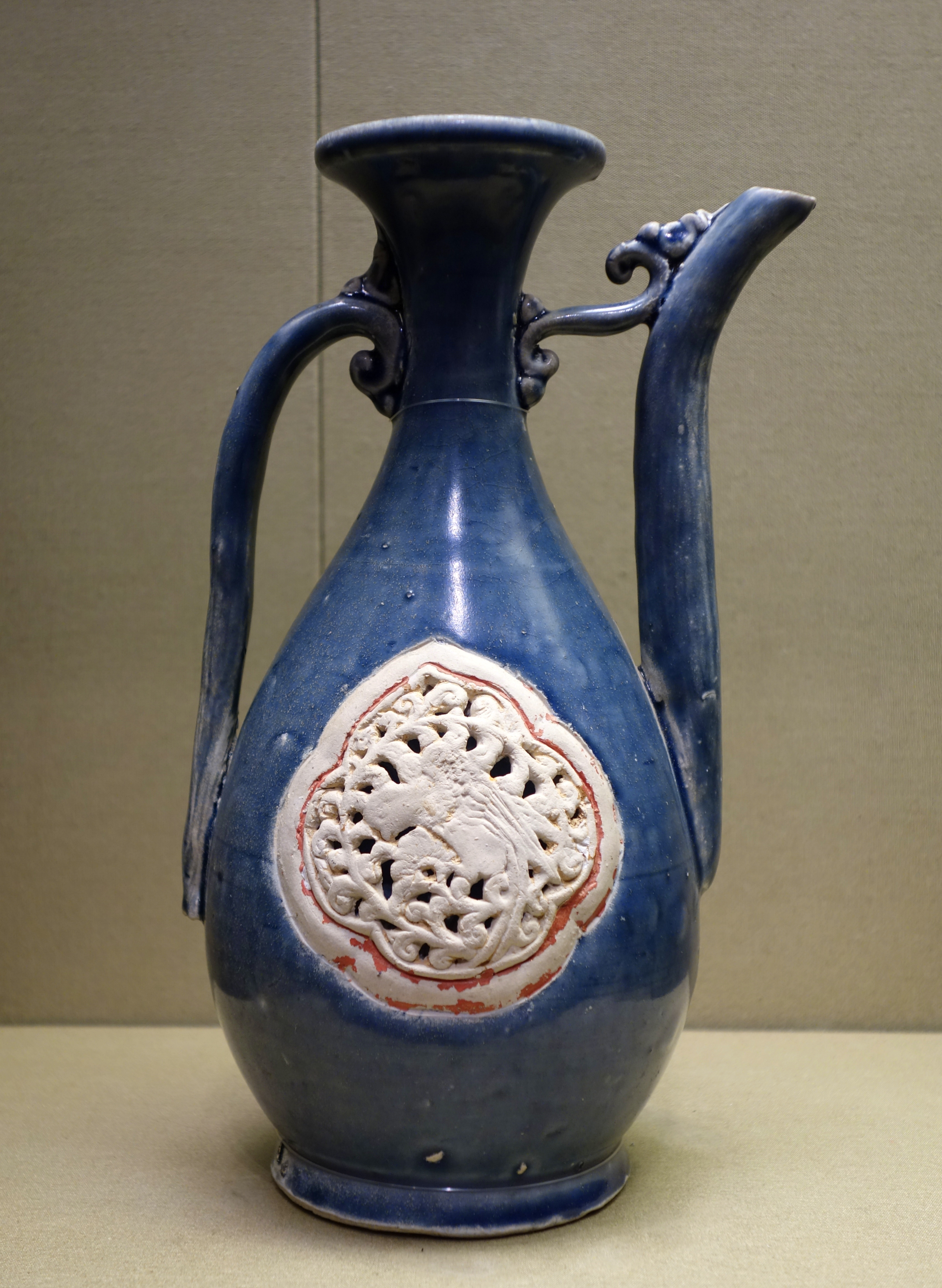
Stoneware vessel from the Hội An wreck

The Hội An wreck, also known as the Cu Lao Cham wreck, lies in the South China Sea 22 nautical miles (41 km; 25 mi) off the coast of central Vietnam at approximately 16.04°N 108.6°E. It was discovered by fishermen in the early 1990s. The Vietnamese government made several attempts to organise an investigation of the site but its efforts initially were confounded by the water depth of 230 feet (70 m). Between 1996 and 1999, the team, which included the Vietnamese National Salvage Corporation and Oxford University’s Marine Archaeology Research Division, recovered nearly 300,000 artifacts.

== History ==
The ship was carrying a large cargo of Vietnamese ceramics dated to the mid-to-late 15th century. The provenance of the pieces was known to be the kilns of the Red River Delta (such as Chu Dau) because excavations in the region had been ongoing since their discovery in 1983. The only pieces remaining at the kiln sites were pieces with faults. Intact examples of the wares produced were rare, since all were exported. When the wreck was found, there was excitement among collectors and archaeologists, for it promised the first cargo consisting solely of Vietnamese wares. (Note: Other wrecks with portions of their cargoes being Vietnamese have been discovered in the South China Sea, including the Pandanan wreck, the Vũng Tàu shipwreck, the Lena cargo, and others.)

Fishermen discovered the wreck in the early 1990s. For several years the site was intensively plundered, resulting in pieces turning up on the market all over the world. The method employed by the looters was to drag a series of hooks across the site with nets behind them to dislodge and catch artifacts. Vietnamese authorities became aware of the wreck following the arrest at Da Nang International Airport of two dealers who had in their possession suitcases full of pottery from the site. The wreck was beyond standard diving depth, but something had to be done quickly to prevent further looting.

In 1996, Malaysian-Chinese businessman Ong Soo Hin teamed up with Oxford University archaeologist Mensun Bound to work with Vietnam's National History Museum to excavate the site, with York Archaeological Trust providing conservation and photographic services. The project took four years and cost an estimated US$14 million. Over 250,000 intact ceramic artifacts were recovered.

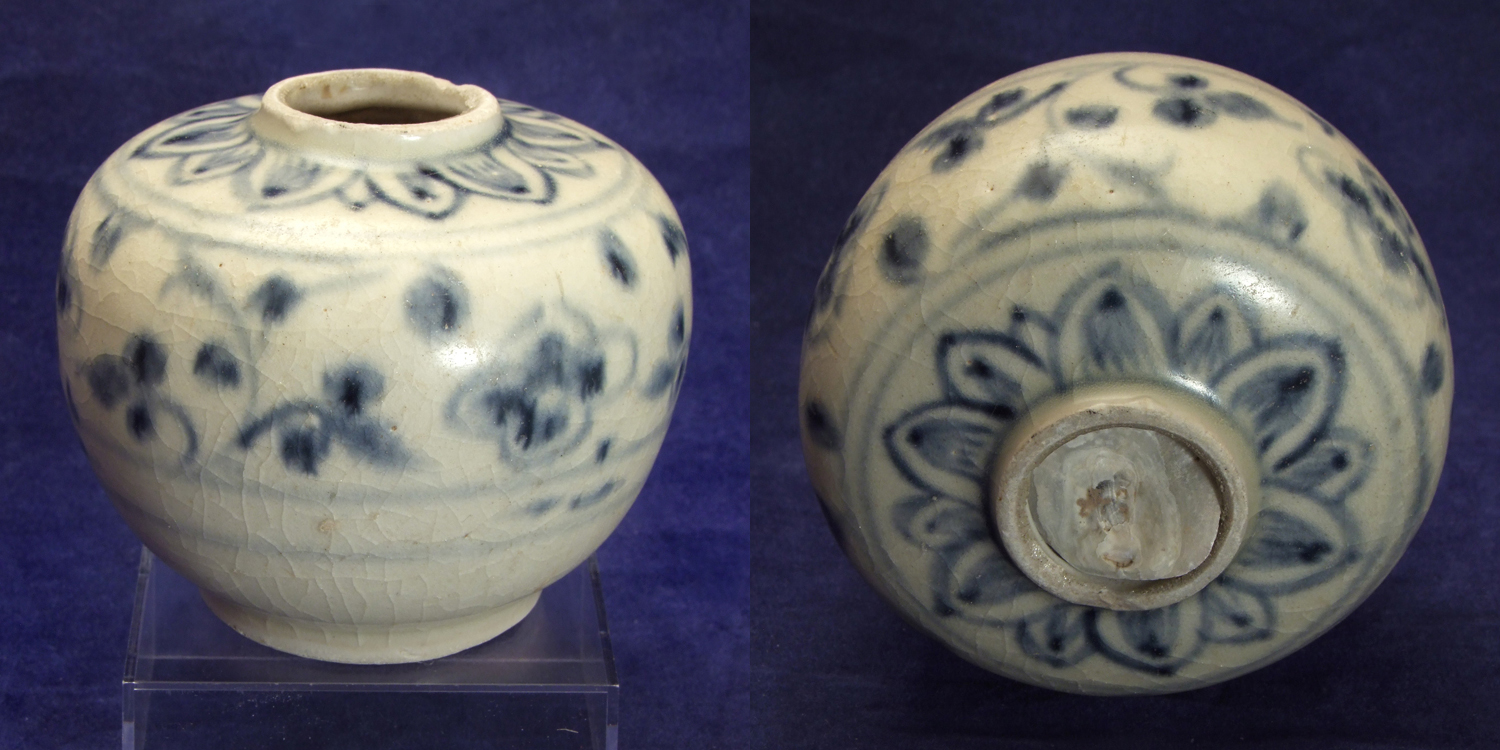
Ming Dynasty, blue and white peony jarlet, recovered from the Hoi An Hoard with ingrown seashell

Over three seasons the team excavated a third of a million pieces of pottery. Most of the pottery was repetitive, everyday tableware of little artistic value but there were also items of outstanding artistry. An "Evaluation Committee" of leading Vietnamese archaeologists and art historians selected all the unique pieces for the National Collection in Hanoi and then other museums were invited to select what they wished. Six museums in Vietnam host permanent exhibitions of material from the wreck.

The remaining 90% was sold at auction in 2000 by Butterfields in San Francisco, California, with the Vietnamese Salvage Agency, Saga Horizon, and the Vietnamese Ministry of Culture dividing any money made. Part of the proceeds were used to pay for the display, curation, and study of the selection that went into the National Collection. The project partners were Oxford University MARE, Saga Horizon, the Vietnam National Salvage Agency (VISAL), and the National History Museum in Hanoi.

== See also ==
- Archaeology of shipwrecks
- Maritime archaeology
- List of shipwrecks
- Marine salvage
- Wreck diving
- Vũng Tàu shipwreck
