= Michael Hatcher =

British explorer and marine salvor (born 1940)

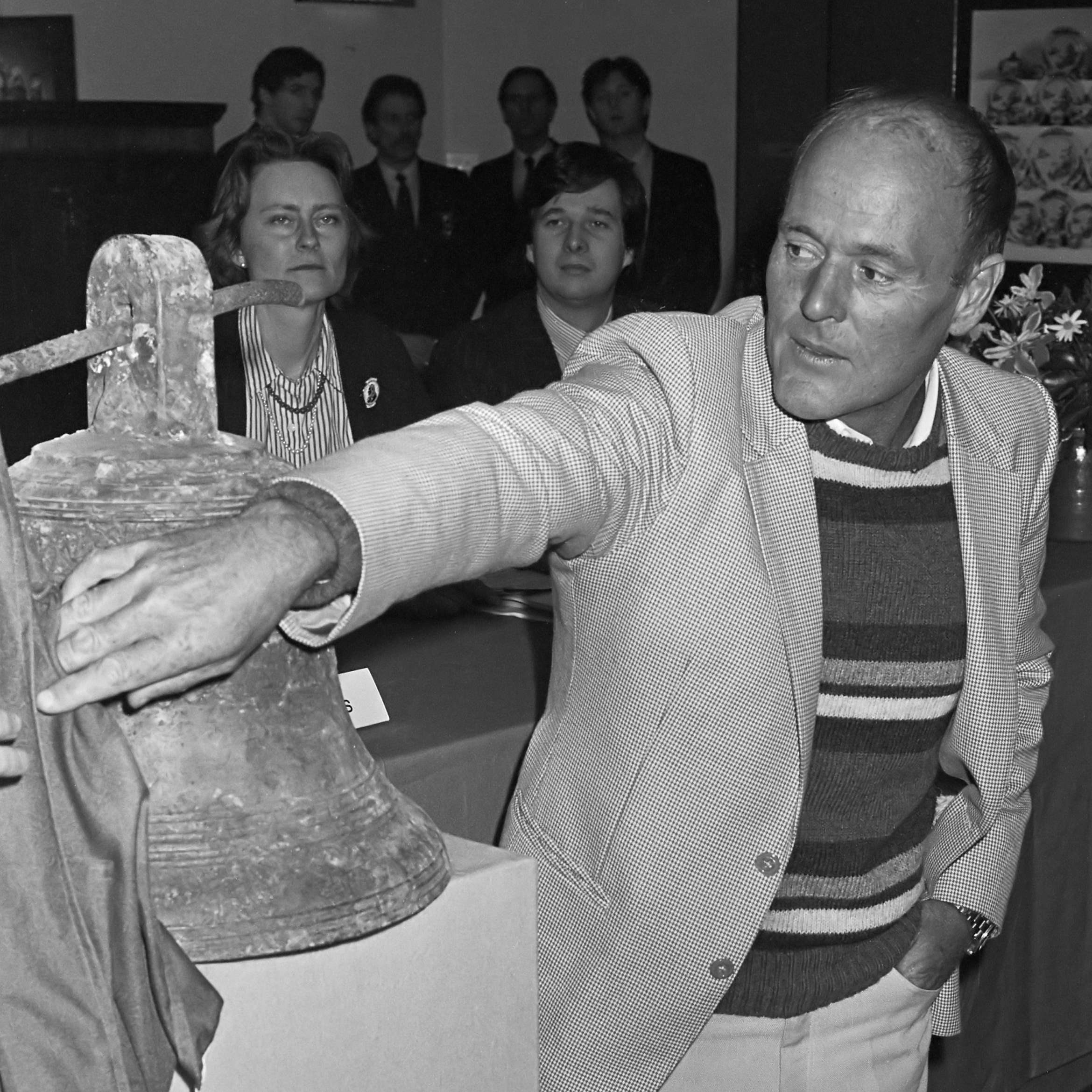
Michael Hatcher unveils a bell found at the "Nanking cargo" site (1986)

Michael Hatcher (born 1940) is a British explorer and marine salvor.

He has specialised in work in the South China Sea. In 1981 he was involved in investigating the wreck of Dutch submarine K XVII.

He is especially known for his recovery of large quantities of Chinese porcelain from the VOC ship Geldermalsen (known as the "Nanking cargo") which was sold at auction by Christie's in Amsterdam in 1986.

== Tek Sing ==
In 1999, he discovered the Tek Sing shipwreck and retrieved 360,000 pieces of porcelain, most of it in impeccable condition, making this the greatest porcelain treasure that has ever been recovered. The cargo originates from the Tek Sing, a junk whose history British shipping researcher Nigel Pickford was able to reconstruct in unprecedented detail. The porcelain was stowed in the tower cargo holds of the ship, where it also served as ballast to stabilize the enormous ship. Most of the porcelain was blue-white porcelain manufactured in the Chinese city of Dehua in the 18th and early 19th century. The greater part of the find is everyday Chinese porcelain utensils intended for export to other countries inside Asia and thus rarely found in the Western hemisphere. As the merchandise had not been made for the European markets, shapes and patterns were not adapted to European taste, but were genuinely Chinese. Other categories of porcelain from different periods were also found, dating back as far the 15th century. The cargo contained a remarkable amount of porcelain of different shapes and sizes, but with identical decoration. It gave buyers in the 21st century the opportunity to compose complete dinner sets with Qing porcelain. Further items such as mercury, sextants, pocket watches, cannons, coins and other merchandise were also salvaged. The recovery was the largest in salvage history.

It is the story of an incredible shipping disaster with more than 1600 dead (and was consequently entitled the “Titanic of the East” by Spiegel news magazine), involving economic difficulties and mass emigration in the early 19th century. The porcelain itself was robust and survived almost 200 years in the sea. Never before have experts been able to examine Chinese export porcelain intended for the South East Asian market on this scale.

The catalogue itself broke new ground, becoming a valuable reference work on porcelain in professional circles. It also served as an auction catalogue in conjunction with the auction list featuring all the individual lots.

Hatcher already had two important finds of Chinese porcelain to his name: the Hatcher Collection (from an unidentified Chinese junk) and the Nanking cargo from the Dutch Geldermalsen that sank in 1752. Both cargoes were successfully auctioned in Europe in the 1980s. Hatcher chose Nagel Auktionen, the leading auction company for Asian art on the European continent, to release the items to the market.

The importance of the discovery and the auction was emphasized by the commissioning of a special book on the history of the Tek Sing and its cargo. Harper Collins published a book about Mike Hatcher's life written by Hugh Edward and Nigel Pickford and titled Treasures of the Deep. The book The Legacy of the Tek Sing contains an account of the story behind the shipwreck, a tale of treachery and heroism, arrogance and greed, all played out against a background of opium smuggling, piracy and mass emigration. It gives details about the salvage as well as the historical background.

== Controversy ==
A number of controversies surround the salvaging of historic wreck cargo undertaken by Michael Hatcher. The salvaging of both the Tek Sing and the Geldermalsen have been heavily criticized by archaeologists for stripping archaeological sites of valuable artefacts without recording any context and destroying the less economically valuable parts of the assemblage, such as the ships themselves.

The Indonesian government tried to stop the sale of the recovered Tek Sing cargo, while seven containers of it were seized by Australian authorities pursuant to their Protection of Movable Cultural Heritage Act 1986 as the Indonesian government had confirmed that they had been illegally exported from its territory. This confirmation came too late for much of the cargo however, and it was able to continue its journey and be sold at auction in Germany. On 12 September 2001, the 71 939 seized ceramics were returned by Australia to Indonesia.

Hatcher has been declared unwelcome in Thailand by its government after he attempted to salvage a shipwreck in its territorial waters.
