= Tek Sing =

Chinese ship that sunk in 1822

Coordinates: 2°24′54.27″S 107°04′10.17″E

History

China
- Name: Tek Sing
- Route: China–Indonesia
- Home port: Amoy
- Fate: Sunk 6 February 1822

General characteristics
- Class & type: Junk
- Tons burthen: 800–900 (bm)
- Length: 50 metres (160 ft)
- Beam: 10 metres (33 ft)
- Height: 27 metres (90 ft)
- Propulsion: Wind-powered
- Sail plan: Junk Rig
- Crew: 200

The Tek Sing (simplified Chinese: 泰兴号; traditional Chinese: 泰興號; pinyin: Tài Xīng Hào; Wade–Giles: T'ai^{4} Hsing^{1} Hao^{4}) was a large three-masted Chinese ocean-going junk which sank on 6 February 1822, in an area of the South China Sea known as the Belvedere Shoals. The vessel was 50 meters in length, 10 meters wide and had a burden of about 800–900 tons. Its tallest mast was estimated to be 27 metres (90 ft) in height. The ship was manned by a crew of 200 and carried approximately 1,600 passengers. It is one of the few "Asian vessels discovered in Southeast Asia [whose name is known]"; generally, neither the name nor the date is known. The Tek Sing is an exception." Generally, shipwrecks are named either after a landmark or location near which they or the cargo they held were found.

== Name ==
Chinese "trading junk", 19th-century

The book The Legacy of the Tek Sing, authored by the vessel's salvor Michael Hatcher and maritime historian Nigel Pickford, suggests her Chinese name was 的惺, meaning "True Star". However, according to Chinese historian Li Bozhong, the exact Chinese name of the vessel is not known and no mention of the ship was made in Chinese records. Taiwanese historian Chen Kuo-tung called the Chinese name offered by The Legacy of the Tek Sing "inexplicable" in Chinese. In contemporary British records, the vessel is named Teek Seeun. Chen speculated that the name was rendered through the Amoy dialect and suggested the alternative name 得順. The great loss of life associated with the sinking has led to the Tek Sing being referred to in modern times as the "Titanic of the East".

== Sinking ==
Sailing from the port of Amoy (now Xiamen in Fujian, China), in 1822, the Tek Sing was bound for Batavia, Dutch East Indies (now Jakarta, Indonesia) laden with a large cargo of porcelain goods and 1,600 Chinese immigrants. After a month of sailing, the Tek Sing's captain, Io Tauko, decided to attempt a shortcut through the Gaspar Strait between the Bangka-Belitung Islands, and ran aground on a reef. The junk sank in about 30 metres (100 ft) of water.

The next morning, February 7, the British East Indiaman Indiana, captained by James Pearl and sailing from Indonesia to Borneo, passed through the Gaspar Strait. The ship encountered debris from the sunk Chinese vessel and an enormous number of survivors. Indiana managed to rescue about 190 of the survivors. Another 18 persons were saved by a wangkang, a small Chinese junk captained by Jalang Lima. This Chinese vessel may have been sailing in tandem with the Tek Sing, but had avoided the reefs.

== Discovery ==
On 12 May 1999, British marine salvor Michael Hatcher discovered the wreck of the Tek Sing in an area of the South China Sea north of Java, east of Sumatra and south of Singapore. It is the largest Chinese wooden shipwreck ever discovered.

== Cargo ==
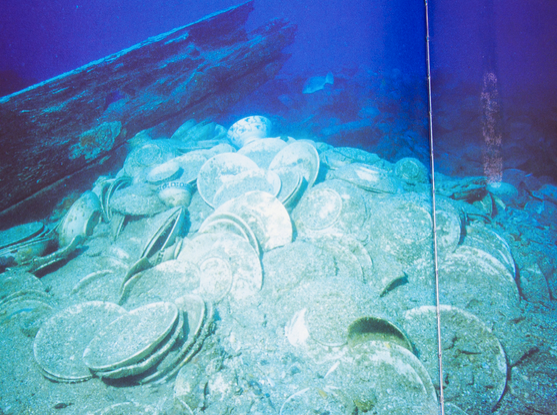
Porcelain during recovery

Hatcher's crew raised about 350,000 pieces of the ship's cargo in what is described as the largest sunken cache of Chinese porcelain ever recovered. The bulk of the ceramics was Chinese blue-and-white common tableware, consisting of bowls, tea cups and the like, made in the kilns of Dehua, China. Dehua was famous earlier for its blanc-de-Chine pure-white figurines, but during the 18th and 19th centuries began to mass-produce such pieces for the local markets. At a talk that Captain Hatcher gave to the Southeast Asian Ceramic Society in Singapore on 4 October 2000, he noted that the ceramics "had not been made for the European markets—shapes and patterns were not adapted to European taste, but are genuinely Chinese." A number of earlier Longquan celadons were also found, but Hatcher believed that they were probably the personal possessions of one or more passengers given their limited numbers and the fact that they were found separate from the main bulk cargo.

The Tek Sing's recovered cargo was auctioned at Nagel Auctions in Stuttgart, Germany in November 2000, bringing in more than $10 million.

== Casualties ==
Human remains were found but were not disturbed as most of Hatcher's crew, being Indonesian and Chinese, believed that bad luck would befall any who disturbed the dead. According to UNESCO's Silk Road Programme listing of shipwrecks, "The Tek Sing wreck could have given testimony to one of the biggest catastrophes in the history of seafaring: the sinking of this large junk, that occurred in February 1822 on a journey between the port of Amoy (now Xiamen, China) and Batavia, Dutch East Indies (now Jakarta, Indonesia), took about 1,500 people—mostly Chinese immigrants—to the bottom of the sea."

== In fiction ==
- The Porcelain Maker's Daughter, by YU Qiang, translated from the Chinese by WANG Guiping (2025) ISBN 979-8297490147 // 于强著，汪桂平译：《泰兴号》

== See also ==
- Sinking of the Titanic
- Marine disasters
- Archaeology of shipwrecks
- Marine salvage
- Vũng Tàu shipwreck
