= British Army (1811 ship) =

British merchant ship (1811–1822)

History

United Kingdom
- Name: British Army
- Namesake: British Army
- Owner: 1812: M'Kenzie; 1815: Clarkson
- Builder: Francois Robitaille, Quebec
- Launched: 13 June 1811
- Fate: Foundered 1822

General characteristics
- Tons burthen: 450, or 45016/94, or 459, or 45954/94 (bm)
- Length: 119 ft (36 m)
- Beam: 30 ft (9.1 m)
- Depth of hold: 7 ft (2.1 m)
- Complement: 17 (at loss)
- Armament: 2 × 4-pounder guns + 12 × 12-pounder carronades

British Army was launched in 1811 at Quebec. She initially traded across the Atlantic. After the British East India Company in 1814 lost its monopoly on the trade with the East Indies, British Army made several voyages there. She then traded across the Atlantic again, and to the Mediterranean. A wave wrecked her at sea in 1822 in the Atlantic.

== Career ==
Lloyd's List reported on 1 October 1811 that British Army, Pelter, master, had put into Portsmouth with 14 feet of water in her hold. She had also lost her bowsprit.

British Army was re-registered at London on 5 March 1812.

British Army appeared in Lloyd's Register in 1812 with L. Pelzer, master, changing to M'Iver, M'Kenezie, owner, and trade London–Quebec.

On 1 March 1815 British Army was among a large number of transports that sailed from Cork with troops and stores for Bermuda.

In 1813 the British East India Company (EIC) had lost its monopoly on the trade between India and Britain. British ships were then free to sail to India or the Indian Ocean under a licence from the EIC. British Army's owners applied for a licence on 21 November 1814 and received the licence the next day.

British Army, Meriton, master, sailed from Portsmouth bound to Bengal on 2 January 1816. On 11 January she was at 42°30′N 10°40′W, about 100 miles WSW of A Coruña. On 3 January 1817 she was back at Deal, having left Bengal on 12 August and the Cape of Good Hope on 11 December.

By one listing, on 3 September 1817 Captain W. Campbell sailed British Army to Bombay. However reports of ship arrivals and departures show that she sailed on 8 July from Gravesend for Île de France, where she arrived on 17 October., She left on 30 October for Batavia, and arrived there on 20 April 1818. She arrived back at The Downs on 22 September 1818.

On 16 July 1819 Lloyd's List reported that British Army, Palmer, master, had arrived at Portsmouth from the West Indies. During the night of 30 June she had run afoul of the American brig Orleans, which was sailing from Liverpool to Portsmouth, New Hampshire. British Army had her bowsprit sprung, her jib boom and spritsail yard broken, and had suffered other damage. Orleans lost her mainmast and her foretopmast, and had sustained other damage. She also had taken in a lot of water. She was going to put into the Western Islands to effect repairs.

A report from Ramsgate dated 14 March 1821 stated that British Army had grounded on the Goodwin Sands while sailing to Fiume but had gotten off and resumed her voyage.

British Army last appears in Lloyd's Register for 1822 with J. Stevens, master, A. Clarkson, owner, and trade Plymouth–America.

== Fate ==
British Army, Stevens, master, was on a voyage from Saint John, New Brunswick to Liverpool on 6 February 1822. As she was scudding before a heavy gale in the Atlantic Ocean (48°43′N 26°00′W) a wave struck her. It swept one man overboard, and broke the leg of another, tore away her bulwarks and everything on deck, and stove in her stern. She started to take on so much water her pumps could not keep up and she became water-logged. The crew took to her masts and stayed there with only a little bread and water to sustain them. On 10 February the ship's carpenter died of exposure. Then on 11 February the ship Rose appeared and rescued Stevens and the 14 other surviving crew. Rose, Pearce, master, had been sailing from Rio de Janeiro when she encountered British Army. Rose arrived at Guernsey on 20 February.
