= Banggéra =

Philippine architectural feature

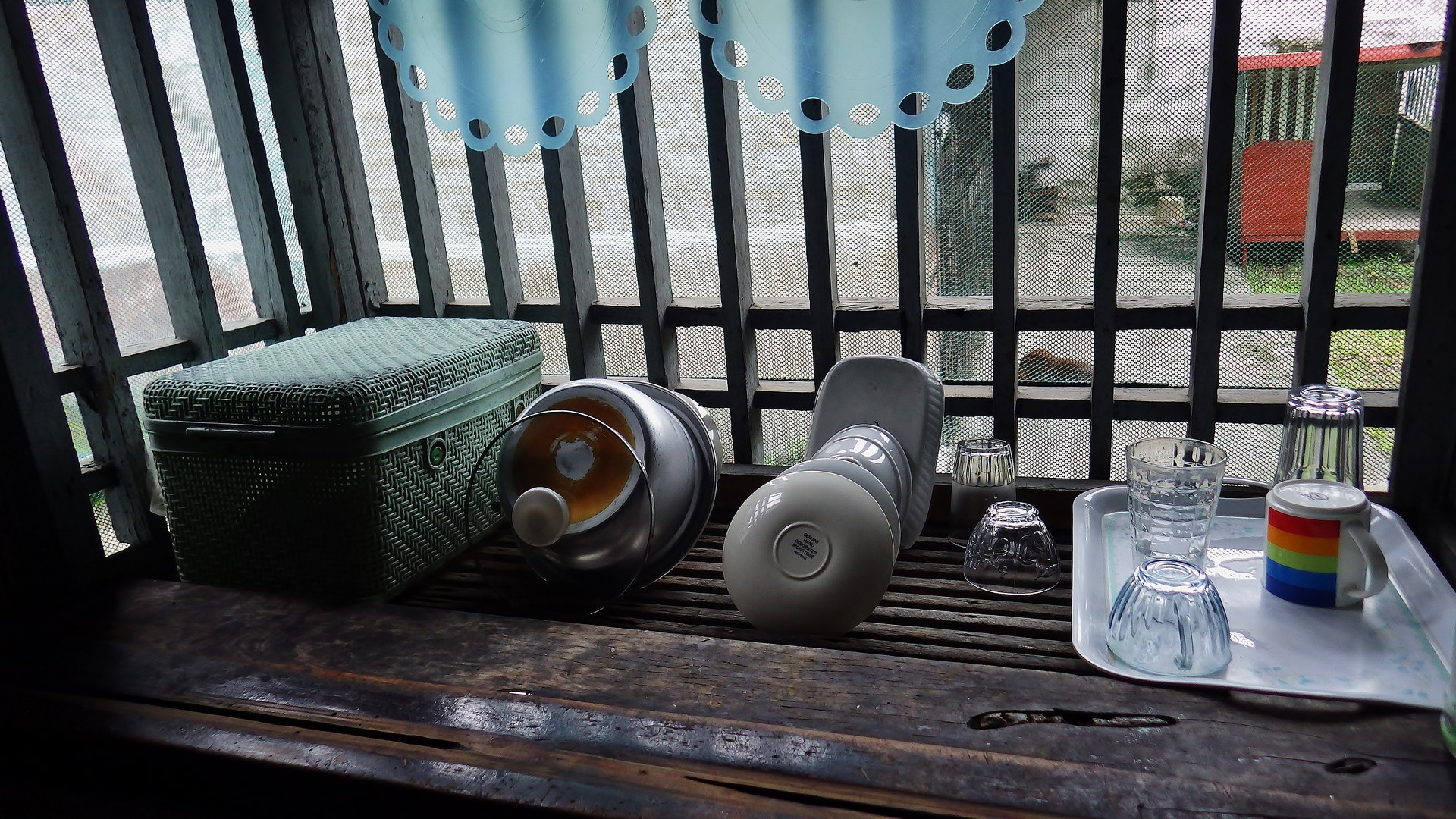
A banggéra at the Ciriaco Coronel Ancestral House in Santa Ana, Manila, containing modern dining implements

In Philippine architecture, the banggéra, also known as the bánggerahán, is a feature in a kitchen or dining room of a bahay kubo or bahay na bato, originating from a time when public drainage systems were still uncommon.

As a counter space made of slatted wood that protrudes from the kitchen or dining room to the back lawn, it serves as the space for the dish-washing and air-drying of cookware, kitchen utensils, and tableware before they are stored in a sideboard (platera) or cupboard (pamingganan). Newly washed cups are typically inverted on the ends of wooden sticks and the plates are placed between or above the slats.

Because the banggéra is made of slatted wood, it is a source of natural light that enters the counter space.

== Tapáyan ==
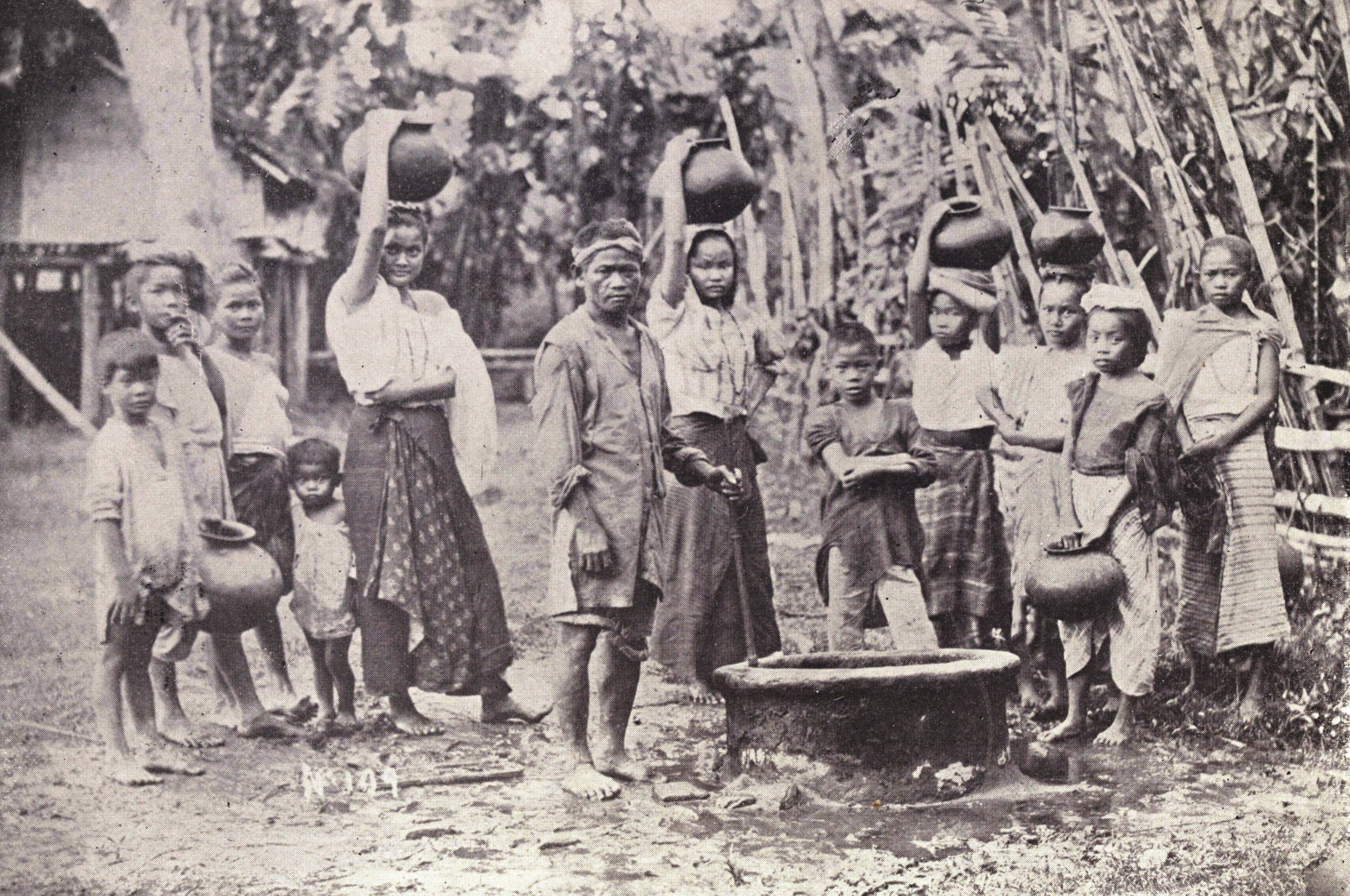
Iloilo natives carrying tapáyan jars

As the banggéra is an architectural feature from a time before the introduction of indoor plumbing, commonly associated with it is the tapáyan (also called bangâ), an earthenware jar that stores water and keeps it cool; this jar typically had its place on the far left or right of the slatted counter.

Very often, a dipper would be found on top of a plate that would serve as the lid of the jar, and moss surrounding an old tapáyan would also often be left alone to contribute to the cooling of the jar's contents. Before the era of tap water, drinking water for storing in the tapáyan were sourced from either nearby wells or natural springs.

== Gallery ==
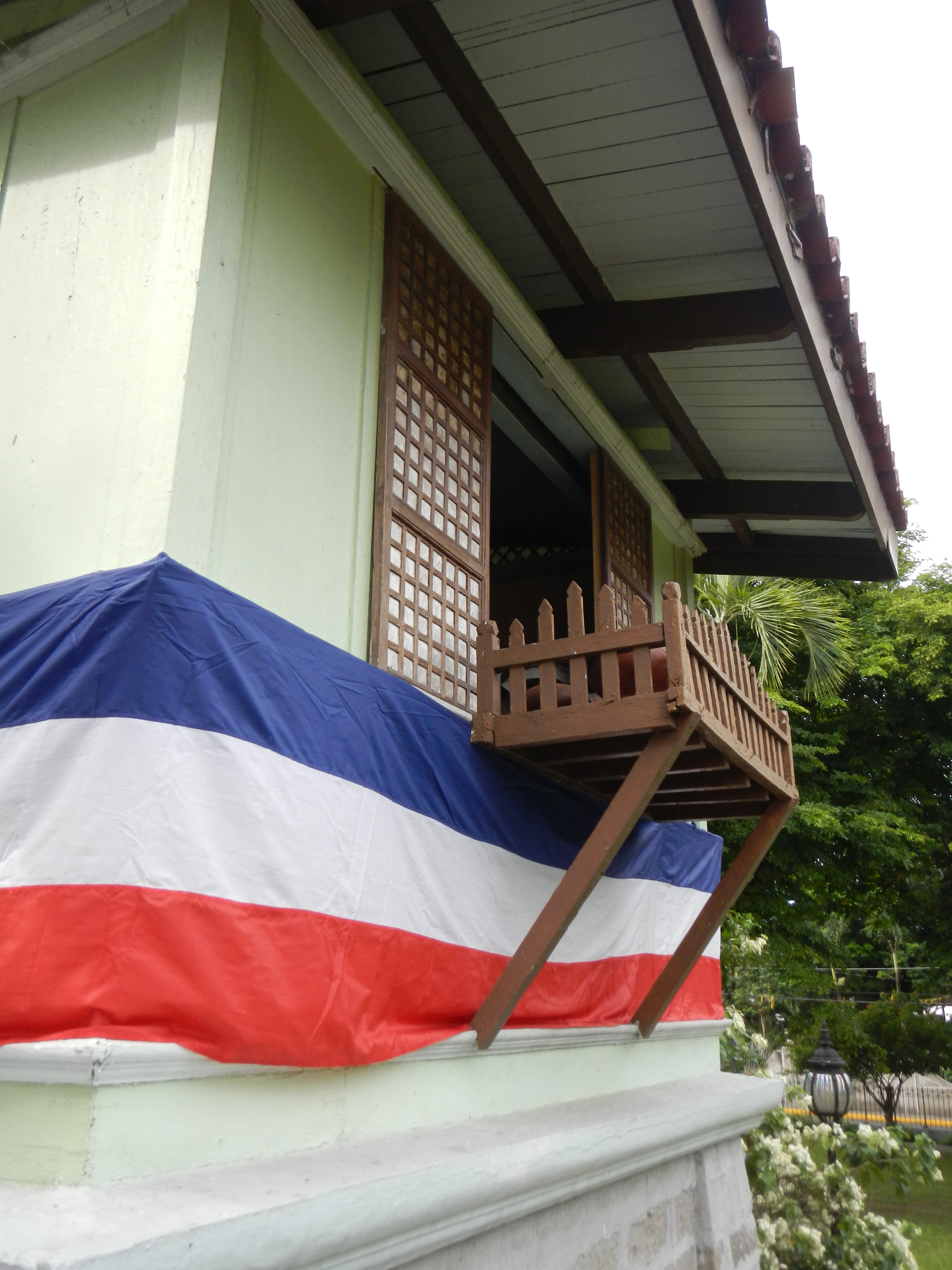
Exterior of the banggéra of the Rizal Ancestral House in Calamba, Laguna, Philippines

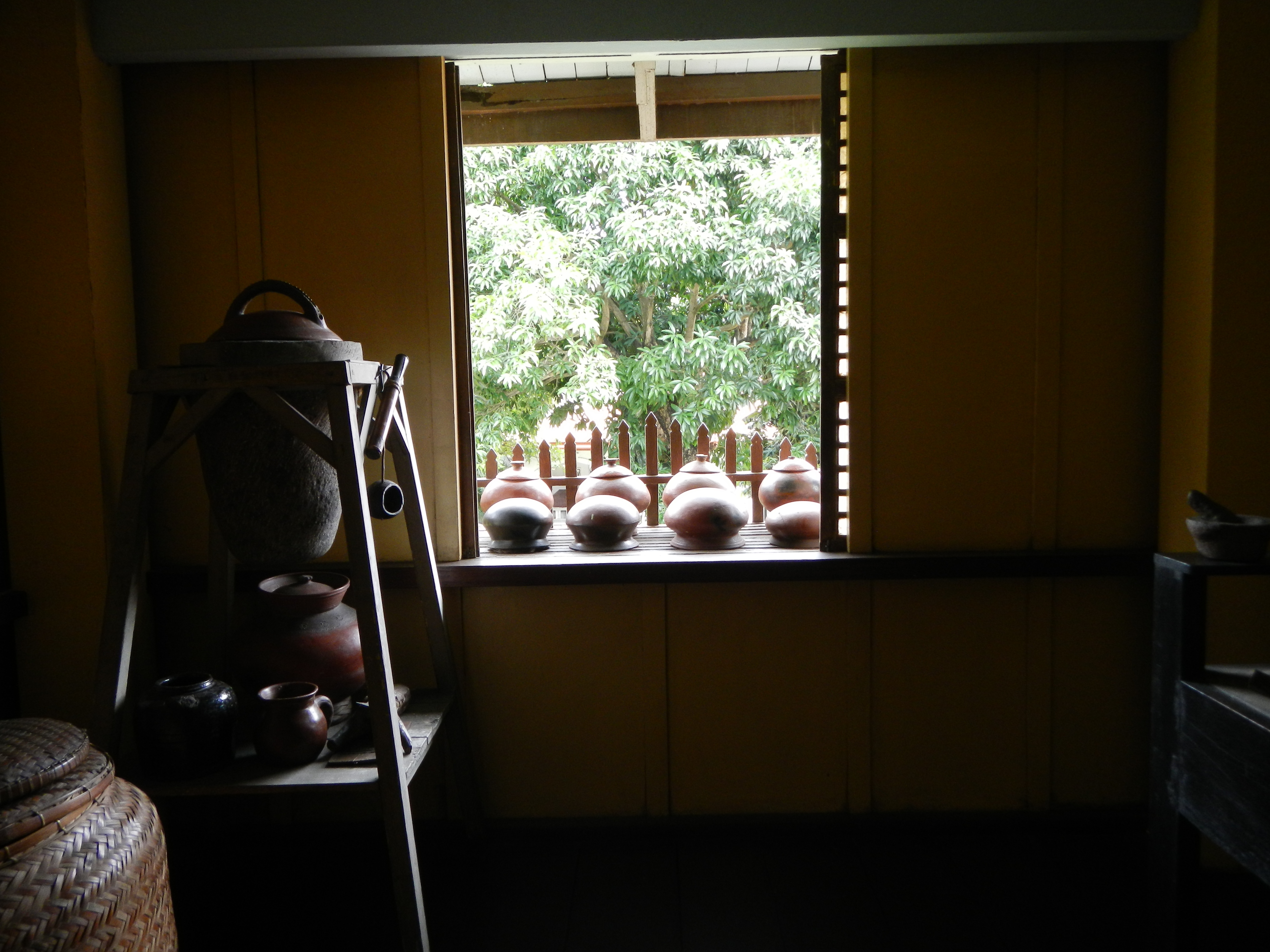
The banggéra at the Rizal Shrine in Calamba, here used for drying palayoks, traditional earthenware pots used for cooking

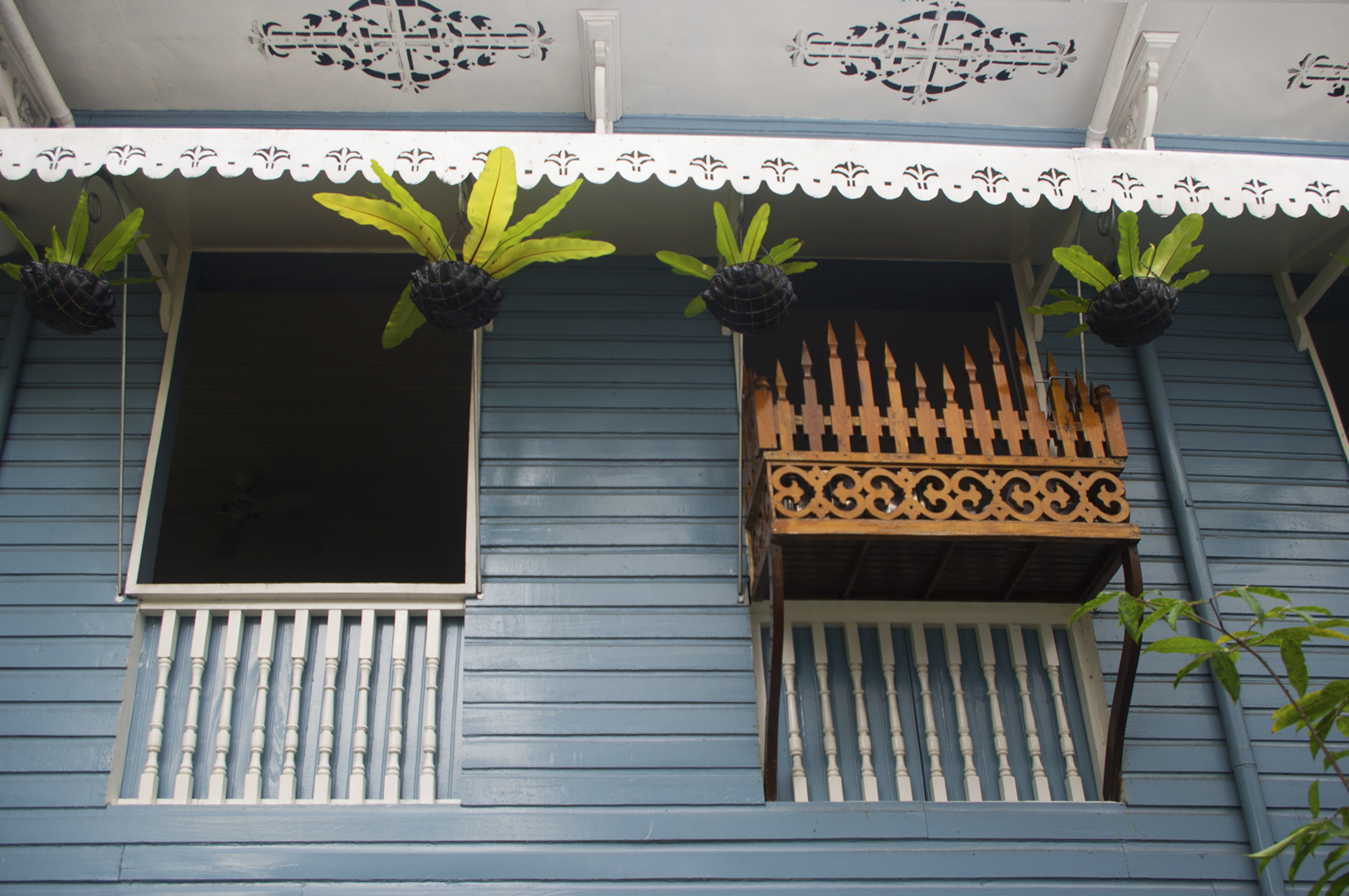
Exterior of the banggéra at the Baysa-Villoso House in Sariaya, Quezon

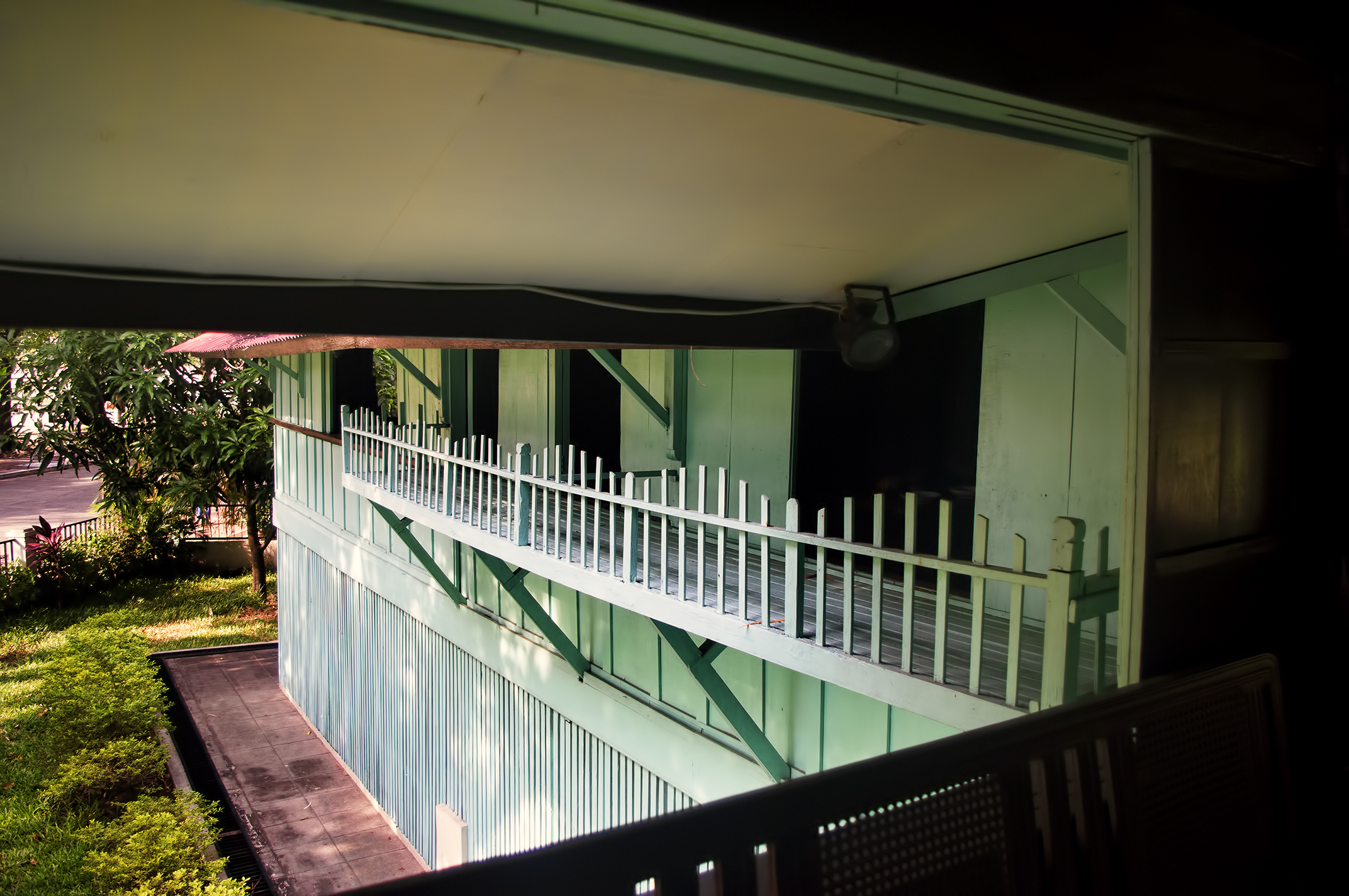
An extra-long banggéra at the Apolinario Mabini Shrine in Santa Mesa, Manila

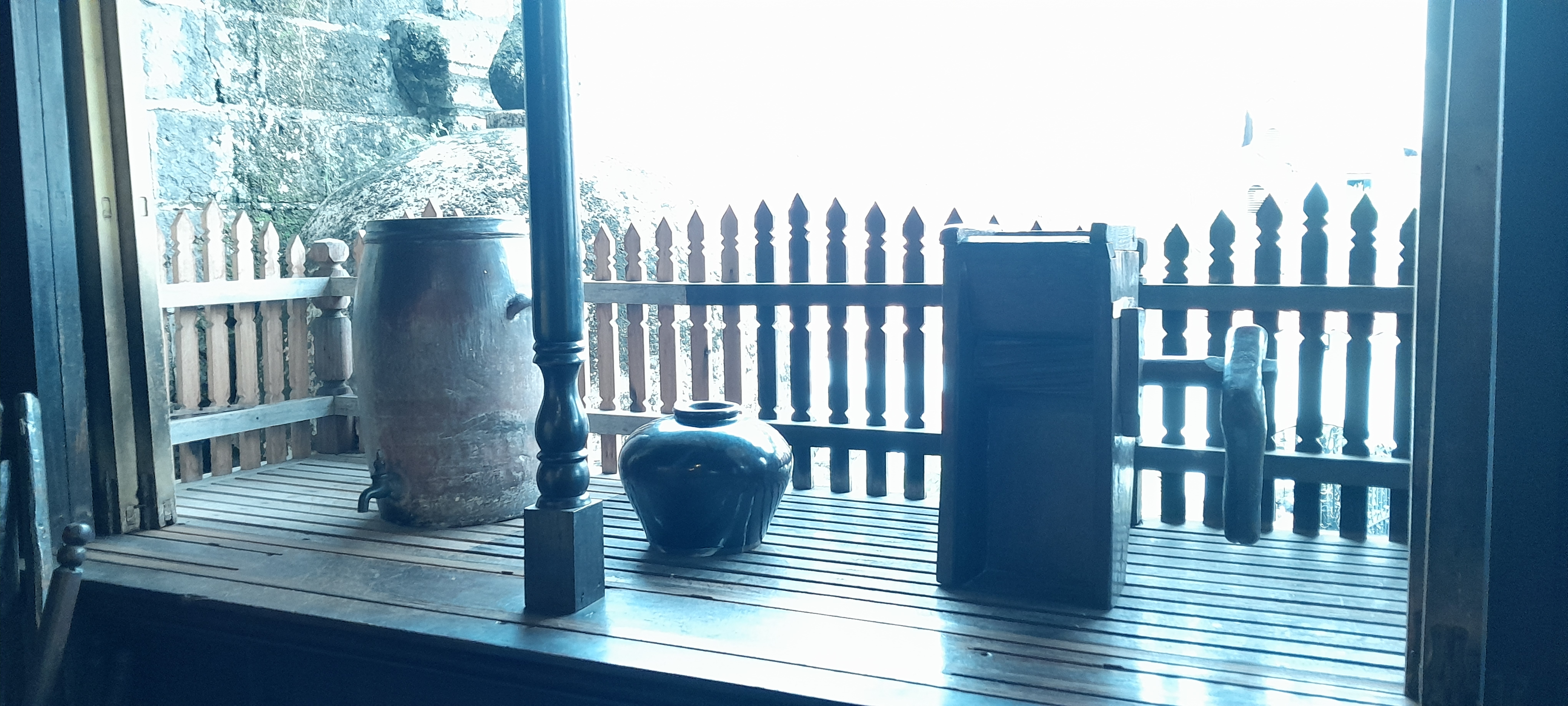
A banggéra at Casa Manila, here used as a display shelf for two tapáyan jars (one with a faucet) and a mill.

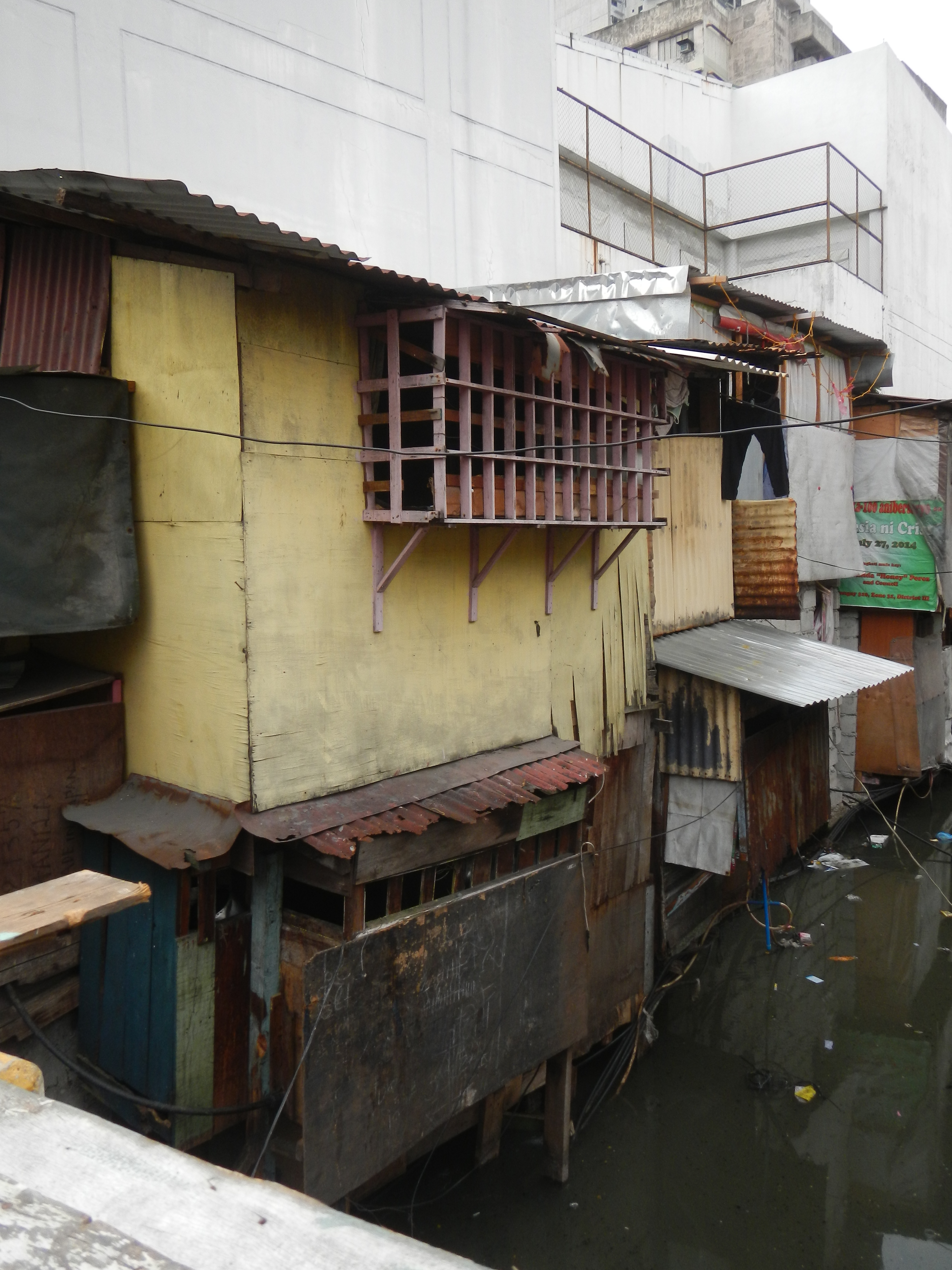
A modern banggéra in a Manila slum

== See also ==
- Dirty kitchen
- Bahay na bato
