= Bahay kubo =

Type of Filipino stilt house

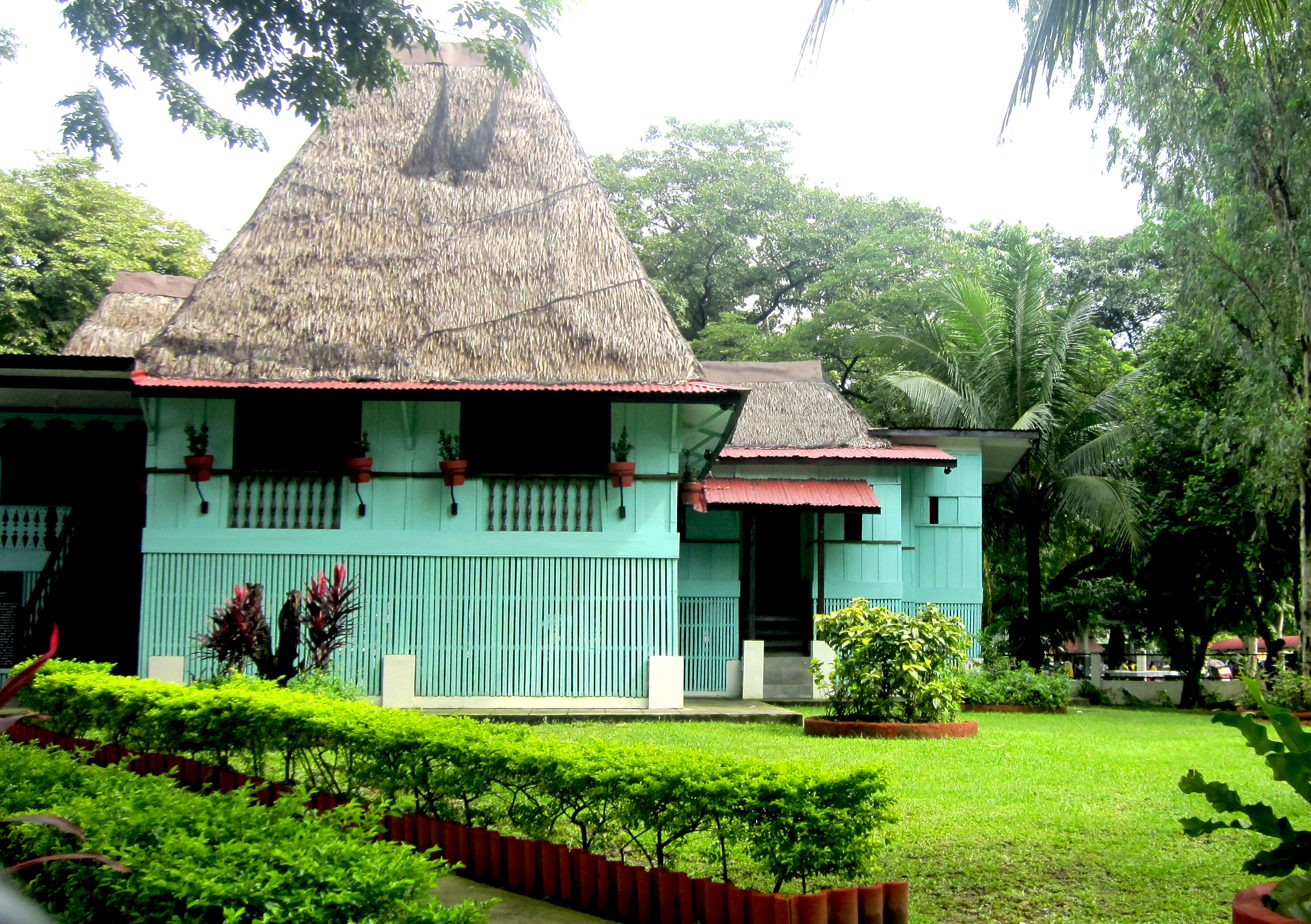
The Mabini shrine, a surviving historic example of a traditional bahay kubo

The báhay kúbo, kubo, or payág (in the Visayan languages), is a type of stilt house indigenous to the Philippines. It is the traditional basic design of houses among almost all the lowlanders of the entire Philippines, and also frequently seen in Philippine Provinces. Often serving as an icon of Philippine culture, its design heavily influenced the Spanish colonial-era bahay na bato's architecture.

The English term nipa hut is also usually used interchangeably with báhay kúbo, although not all báhay kúbo use nipa materials or are huts. Both "nipa hut" and báhay kúbo are also used incorrectly to refer to similar but different vernacular architecture in the Philippines.

== Etymology ==
The Filipino term báhay kúbo roughly means "country house", from Tagalog. The term báhay ("house") is derived from Proto-Malayo-Polynesian *balay referring to "public building" or "community house"; while the term kúbo ("hut" or "[one-room] country hut") is from Proto-Malayo-Polynesian *kubu, "field hut [in rice fields]".

The term "nipa hut", introduced during the Philippines' American colonial era, refers to the hut version of bahay kubo. While nipa leaves were the thatching (pawid) material often used for the roofs, not all bahay kubo are huts or used nipa materials.

== History ==
=== Classical period (pre-Hispanic era) ===
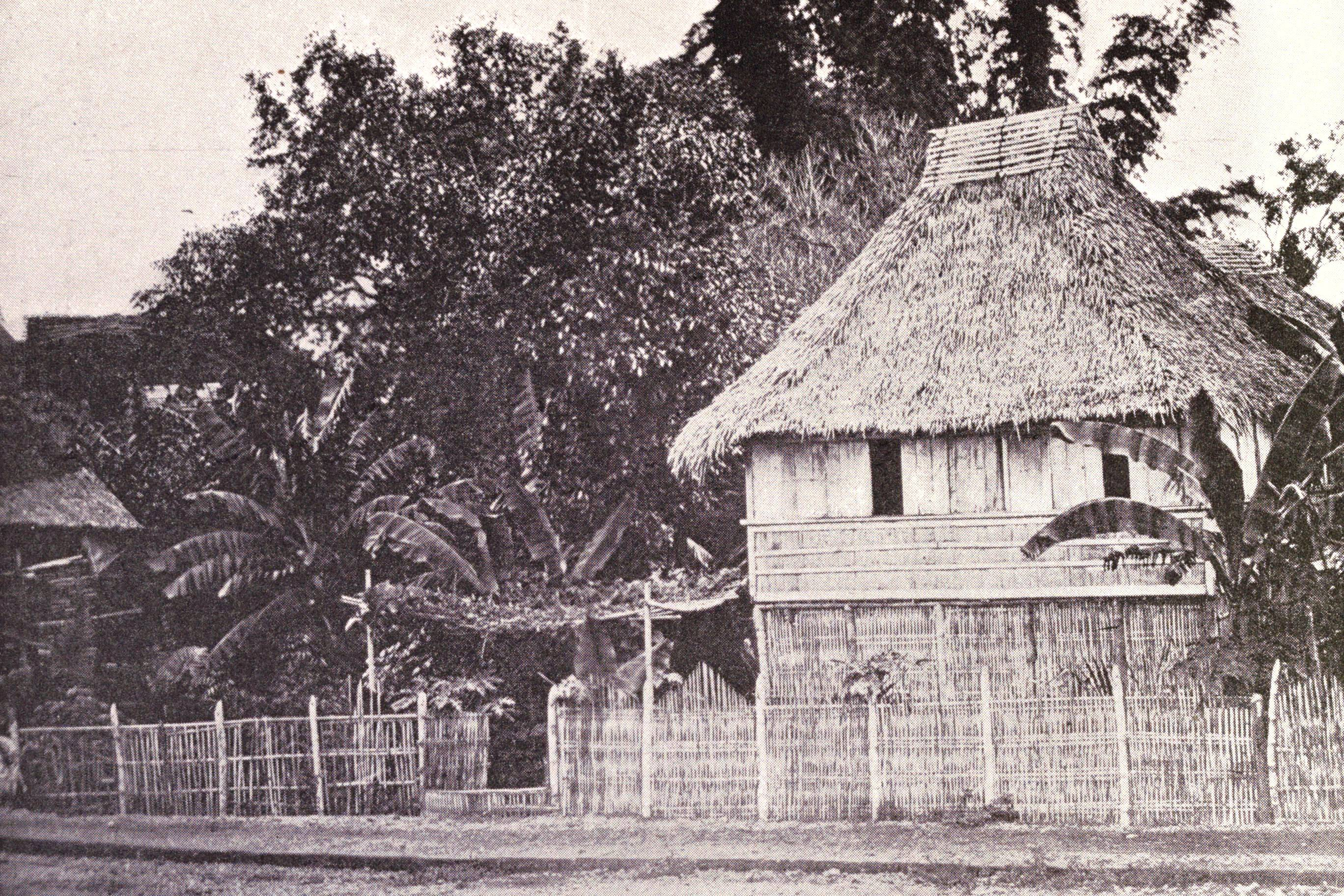
A typical bahay kubo in Manila (c. 1899), note the silong (space beneath the raised floors) enclosed by a loose bamboo fence

Distinction between each tribes and cultures' style may have been more visible during the pre-hispanic period. Different architectural designs are present among each ethnolinguistic group in what is now the Philippines and throughout the Southeast Asia and Pacific as part of the whole Austronesian architecture.

They were designed to endure the climate and environment of the Philippines. These structures were temporary, made from plant materials like bamboo. The accessibility of the materials made it easier to rebuild when damaged by a storm or earthquake.

=== Hispanic era ===
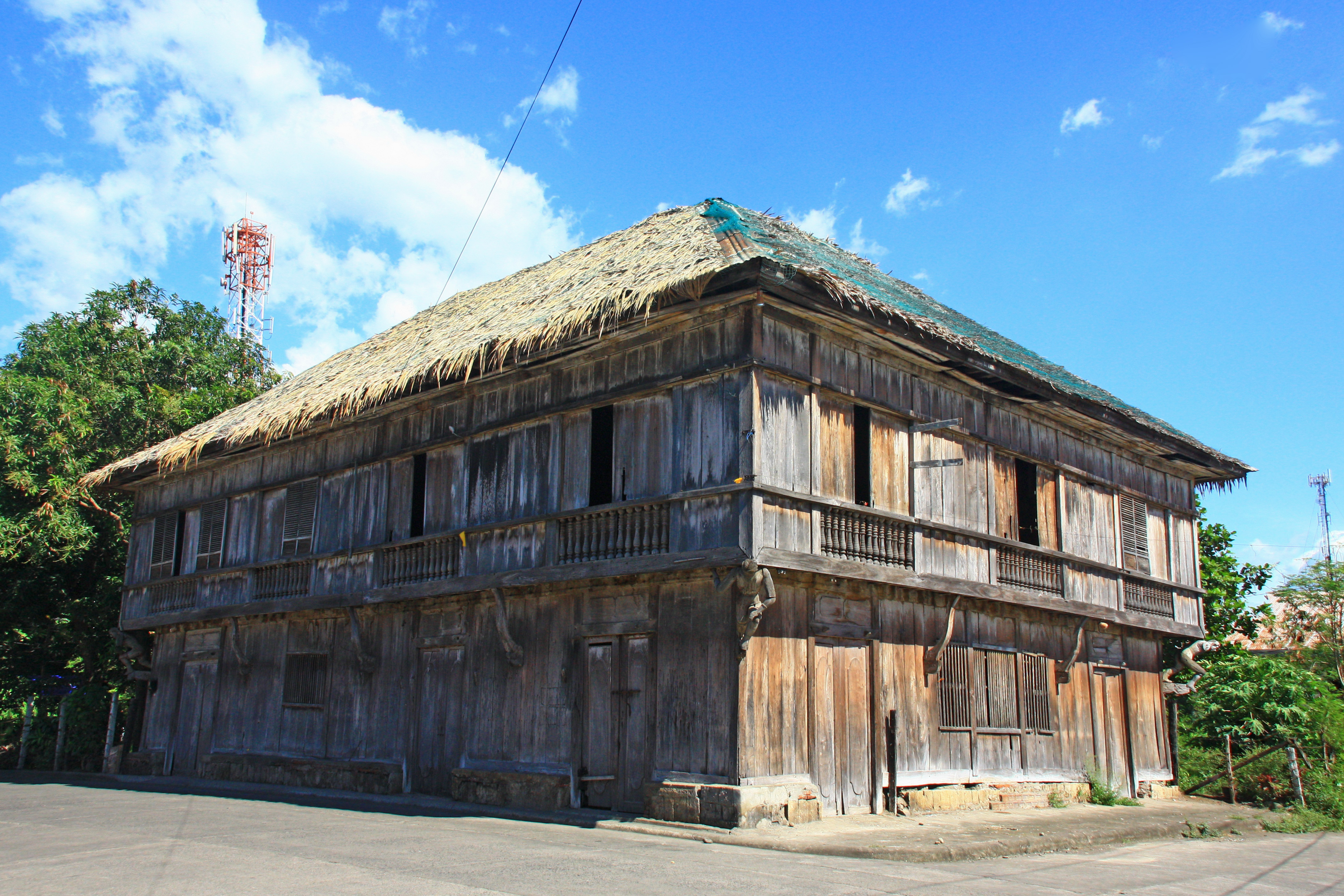
Vega Ancestral House, a Spanish colonial era mansion and a "1st Transition" bahay na bato house with a silong enclosed by a wooden wall. Other than that, its general design remains roughly identical to the bahay kubo

The advent of the Spanish colonial era introduced the idea of building more permanent communities around church and government centers.

Christianized peoples such as the Tagalogs, Visayans, Ilocanos, Kapampangans, Bicolanos, Cagayanons, Zambals, Pangasinenses, Ivatans, Mestizos, Criollos, Chinese and Japanese were sent to live in the lowlands. This established a community with most population of Austronesian origin, each having their own distinct traditions of Austronesian architecture, dating back even before the Hispanic period. They collectively evolved a style of construction that soon became synonymous with the christian lowland culture architecture known as bahay kubo.

Appearance varies from simple huts, later known by the Americans as nipa huts, to mansions like bahay na bato. Architectural designs and furnishings varied from standard Filipino, Chinese, Americas, European to eclectic.

The new community also setup made construction using heavier, more permanent materials desirable. Some of these materials included bricks, mortar, tiles and stone.

Finding European construction styles impractical in local conditions, Spanish and Filipino builders quickly adapted the characteristics of the bahay kubo and combined it with Spanish architectural style.

==== Bahay na bato ====
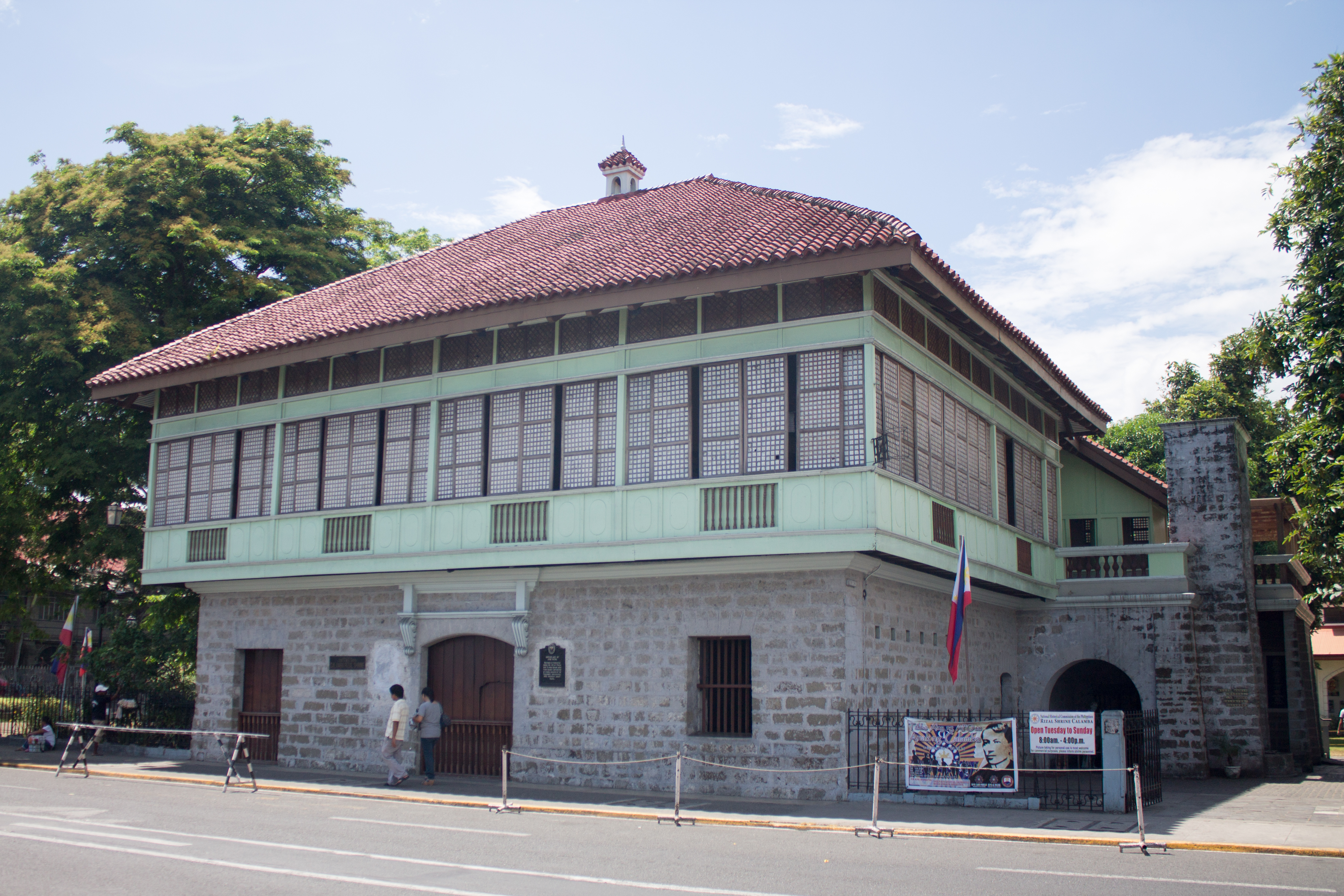
The Rizal Shrine in Calamba, an example of a later Spanish period bahay na bato with a silong enclosed by a stone wall

Bahay na bato developed from the bahay kubo with noticeable Spanish influence. Its design evolved throughout the ages but maintained its nipa hut architectural roots. Its most common appearance is like that of stilt nipa hut that stands on Spanish style stone blocks or bricks as a foundation instead of wood or bamboo stilts.

The bahay na bato, followed the nipa hut's arrangements such as open ventilation and elevated apartments. It was popular among the elite or middle class and integrated the characteristics of the nipa hut with the style, culture, and technology of Spanish architecture. The differences between the two houses were their foundational materials. The bahay na bato was constructed out of brick and stone rather than the traditional bamboo materials. It is a mixture of native Filipino and Spanish influences.

During the 19th century, wealthy Filipinos built houses with solid stone foundations or brick lower walls, and overhanging. Wooden upper story/stories with balustrades. The ventanillas and capiz-shell sliding windows were both native Filipino influences on the design. The thatched nipa roof (pawid) is often replaced with Spanish-style curved clay tiles known as teja de curva. Today these houses are more commonly called ancestral houses.

== Characteristics ==
Bahay kubo were typically made of local building materials such as wood, bamboo, palms (nipa, anahaw, coconut) and cogon grass. The bahay kubo was elevated above ground or water on stilts as protection from pests, predators and floods, and usually consisted of one room where the whole family would dine, sleep and do other household activities; thus, access to the hut was by ladder. The roof was made of palm leaves smoked for waterproofing and consisted of long steep eaves to allow water to flow down more easily. The windows to the hut were large to allow cool air in. Similar conditions in Philippine lowland areas have led to characteristics "typical" of examples of bahay kubo.

=== Overall structure ===
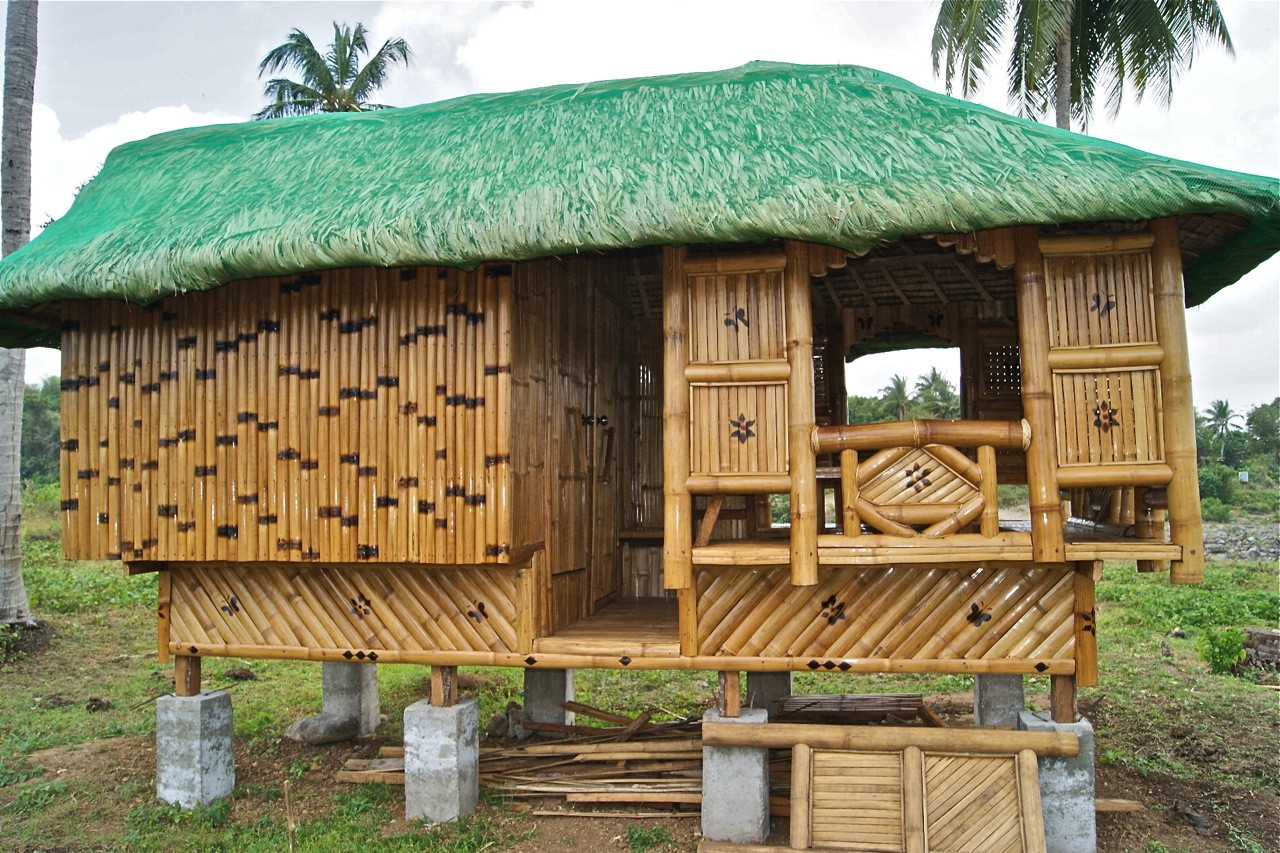
Modern bahay kubo with bamboo walls and pinatong-type posts (haligi). This type of bahay kubo can be lifted and relocated as needed in a tradition known as bayanihan

The bahay kubo, like most Austronesian houses, is raised on house posts ("stilts") known as haligi, which are typically made from whole bamboo or hardwood logs and extends from the ground to the top of the walls. There are two general types of haligi: the binaon refers to haligi which are buried directly on the ground; while the pinatong refers to haligi that are simply placed on top of a flat stone slab.

The main purpose of being raised on stilts is to create a buffer area for rising waters during floods and to prevent pests such as rats from getting up to the living area.

The haligi are connected to each other by horizontal bamboo beams known as the yawi. The yawi in turn are overlaid with secondary bamboo beams known as the patukuran; these in turn are fitted to the soleras, which are bamboo beams laid down 12 to 15 in (30 to 38 cm) apart as joists to support the bamboo slat floor. Depending on the size of the house, these beams can be a single bamboo pole, or multiple tied together.

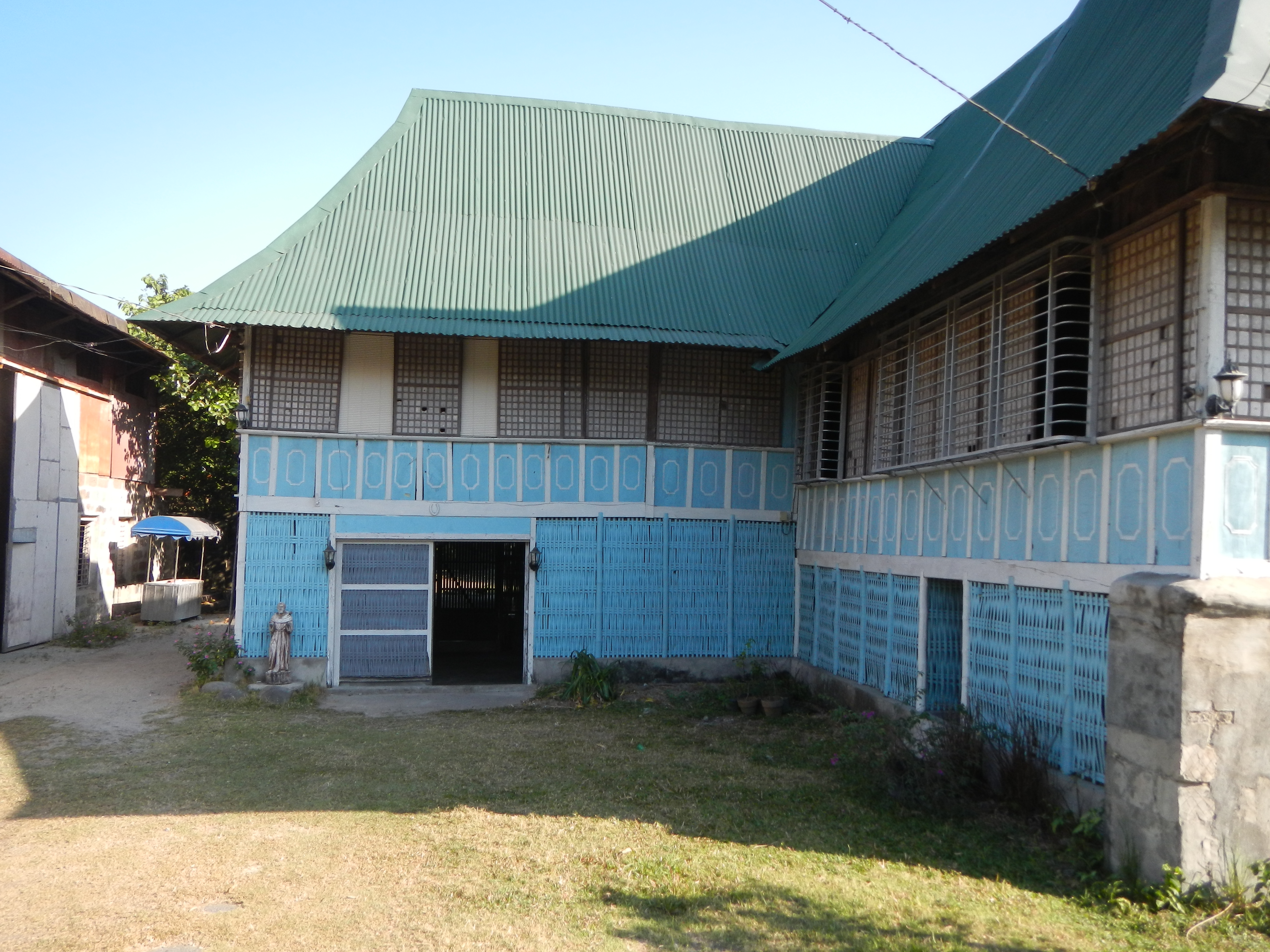
Gosioco ancestral house

The cube shape distinctive of the bahay kubo arises from the fact that it is easiest to pre-build the walls and then attach them to the wooden stilt-posts that serve as the corners of the house. The construction of a bahay kubo is therefore usually modular, with the wooden stilts established first, a floor frame built next, then wall frames, and finally, the roof.

Bahay kubo are traditionally built using only shaped and fitted wood or bamboo and lashings, with no use of nails whatsoever.

==== Walls ====
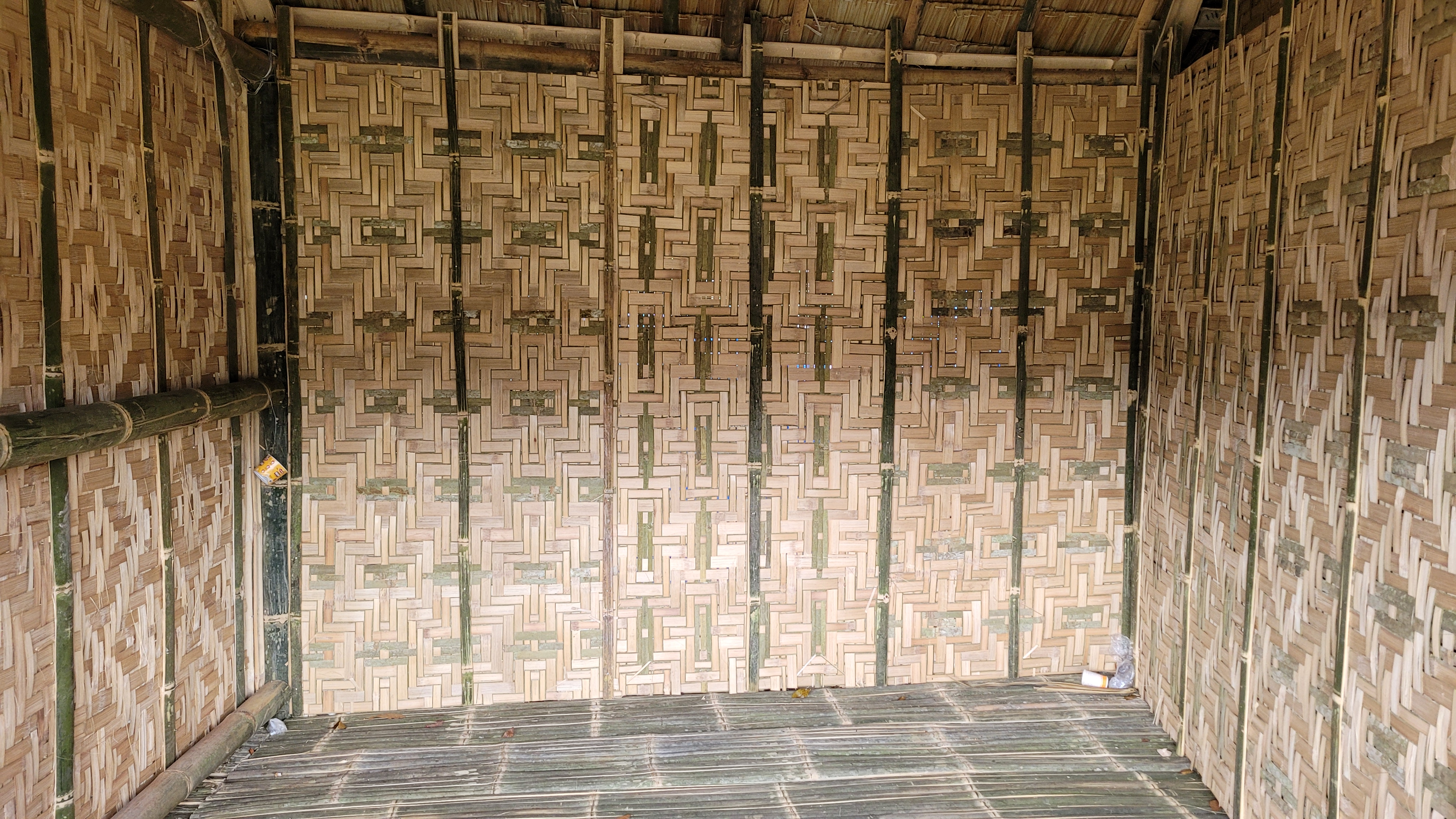
A typical amakan (woven split-bamboo) wall

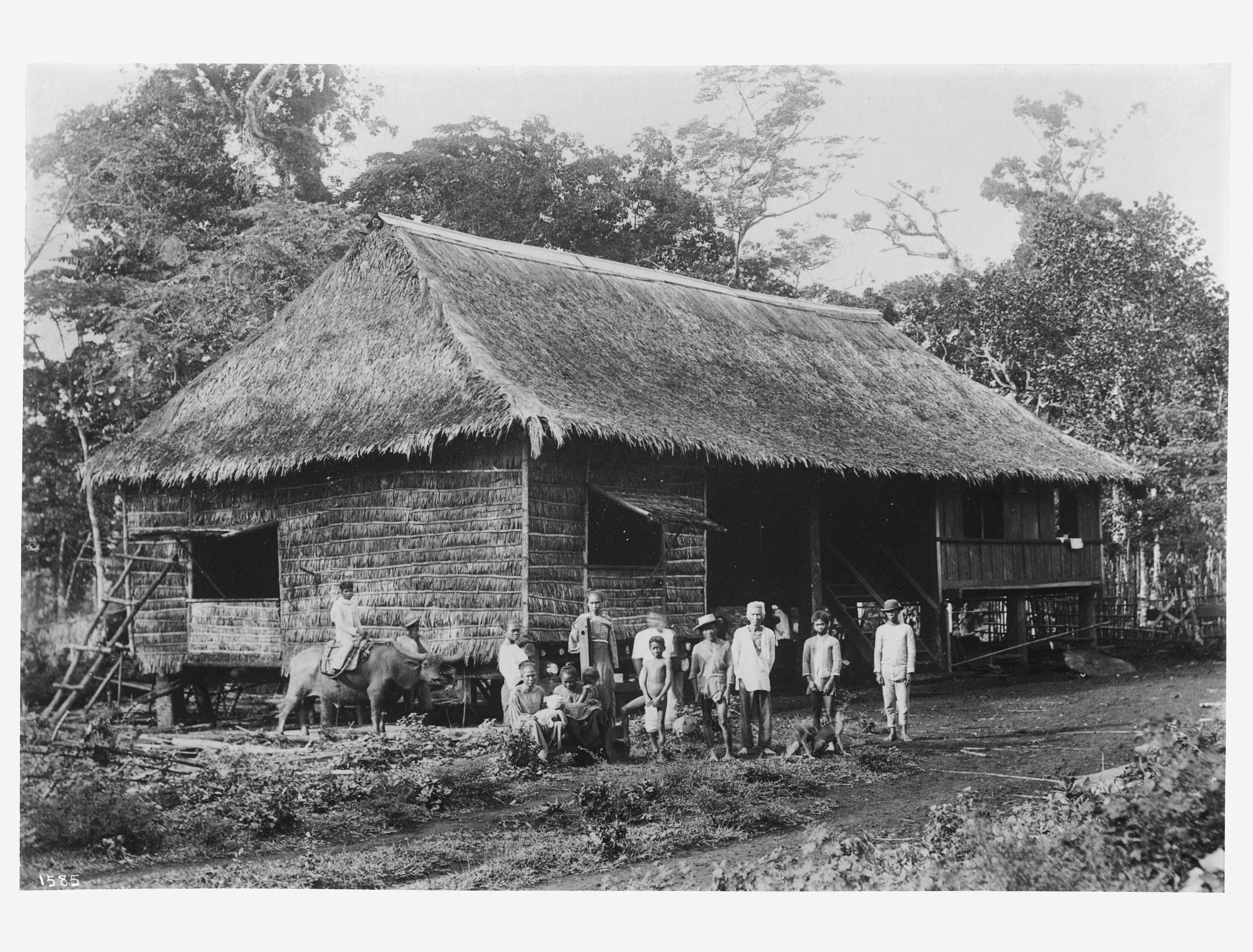
A large bahay kubo with walls made with panels of thatched nipa leaves (pawid), c. 1900

The walls (dingdíng) are traditionally composed of individual wall panels that are securely attached (via rattan bindings) to additional beams known as the gililan which connect the haligi around the perimeter of the house. These can easily be replaced when damaged. Modern and colonial-era versions of bahay kubo built with nails can also feature more permanent walls made from whole or split bamboo poles or wooden planks.

The wall panels can be made from a variety of light materials. The most common is woven bamboo strips known as amakan or sawali. They can also be thatched panels known as pawid, which are made from cogon grass, anahaw, or nipa palm leaves, like the roof. Certain areas can also be made from loosely woven bamboo latticework known as sala-sala, which grants a degree of privacy while still allowing inhabitants to see outside.

In temporary shelters, the walls can also be made from simple panels made from halved coconut palm fronds whose leaves are then woven together. This type of panels are known as sulirap and is somewhat a combination of sala-sala and sawali in functionality, but are much more perishable.

The wall panels let some coolness flow naturally through them during hot times and keep warmth in during the cold wet season.

==== Windows ====
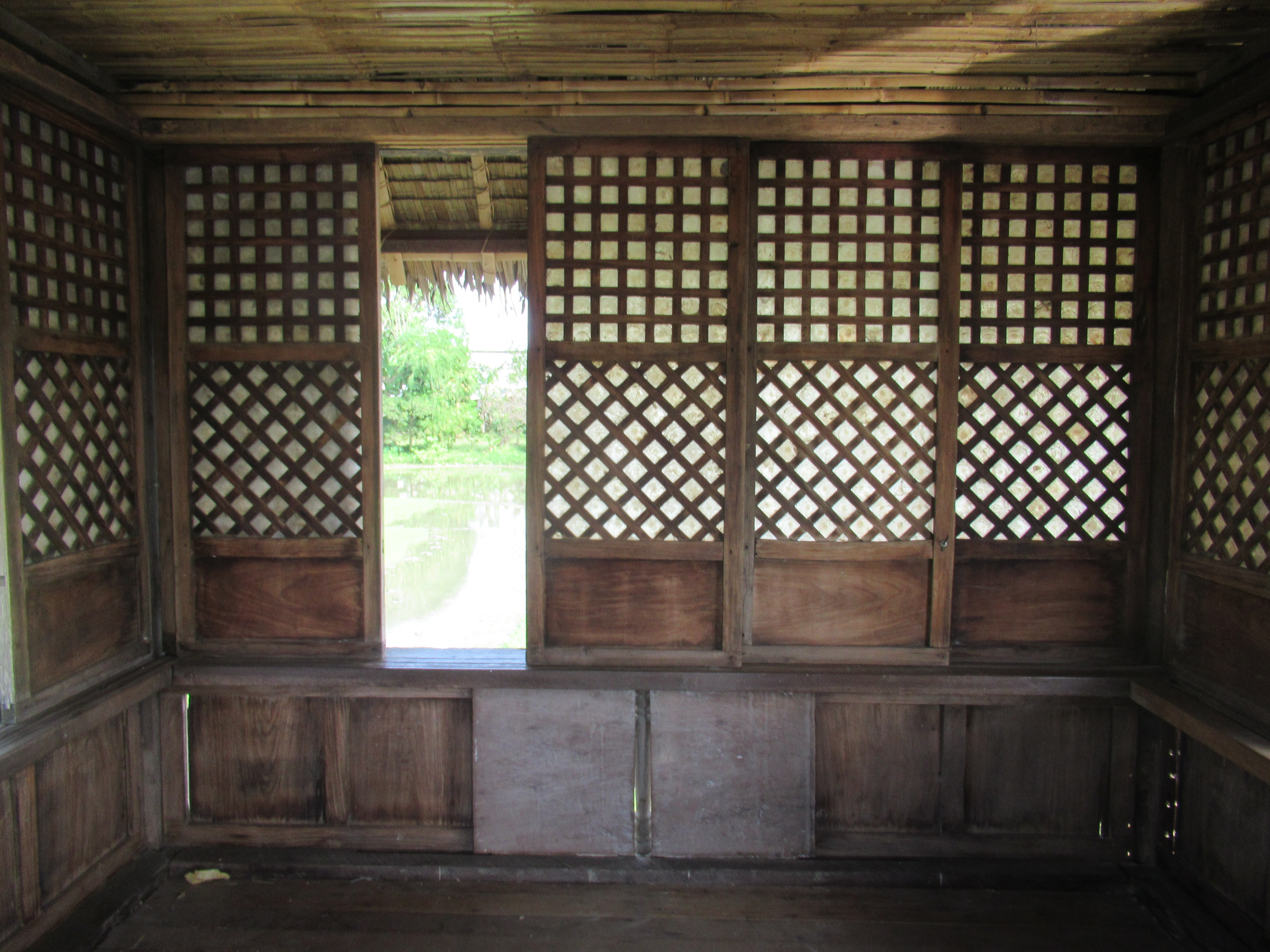
Bahay kubo interior featuring sliding Capiz shell windows

Bahay kubo are typically built with large windows (dungawán), to let in more air and natural light. The most traditional are large awning windows, held open by a wooden rod. Sliding windows are also common, made either with plain wood or with Capiz shell-panes which allow some light to enter the living area even with the windows closed. In more recent decades inexpensive jalousie windows became common.

In larger examples, the large upper windows may be augmented with smaller windows called ventanillas (Spanish for "little window") underneath, which can be opened for ventilation to let in additional air on especially hot days.

=== Roof ===
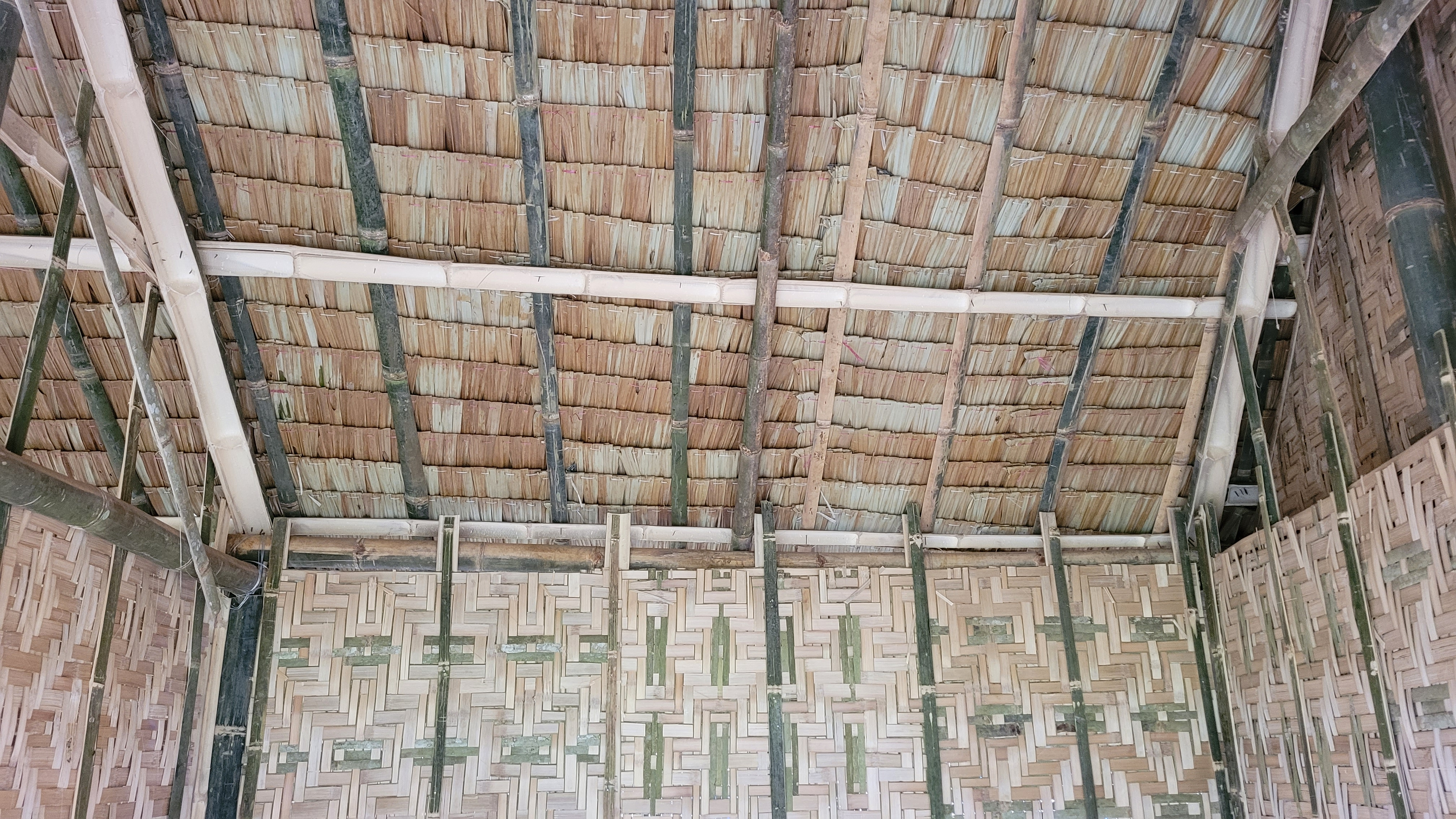
Bahay kubo interior showing nipa leaves roofing

The roof (bubóng) of the bahay kubo is built on a skeletal framework called the balangkas. This is made from bamboo or wood tied or fitted together. The eaves of the roofs are known as sibi. These may further be extended with the pasibi, which are long sloping sections of the roof that extend over the sibi (usually to provide shade for a porch area).

The roof itself is typically thatch, made from either cogon grass, nipa palm leaves, or anahaw leaves. Another traditional roofing material is known as kalaka (Philippine Spanish: calaca). Kalaka are halved bamboo sections that are fitted together alternately, similar to Spanish clay roof tiles. Though unlike clay tiles, each kalaka section spans the entire slope of the roof. The curving surfaces of the bamboo halves serve as channels for rainwater.

The traditional roof shape of the bahay kubo is tall and steeply pitched, with an apex called the "angkub" and long eaves descending from it. A tall roof creates space above the living area through which warm air could rise, giving the bahay kubo a natural cooling effect even during the dry season. The steep pitch allows water to flow down quickly at the height of the monsoon season while the long eaves give people a limited space to move about around the house's exterior when it rains. The steep pitch of the roofs is often used to explain why many bahay kubo survived the ash fall from the Mt. Pinatubo eruption, when more 'modern' houses collapsed from the weight of the ash.

=== Living space ===
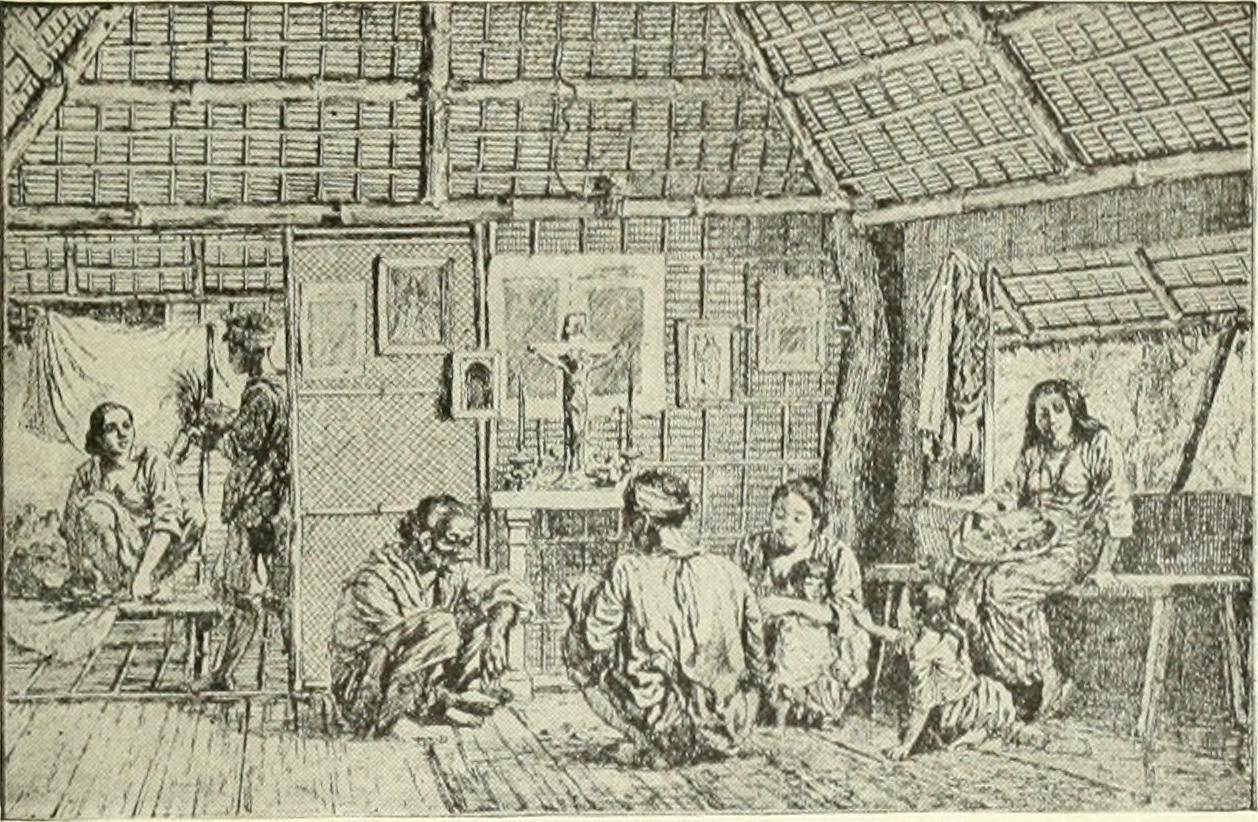
Interior of a typical small bahay kubo during the Spanish colonial era (c. 1899)

The main living area is the raised (second) floor of the bahay kubo known as the bulwagan (also silíd, lit. "interior"). It is accessible via the hagdan, a bamboo or wooden ladder that extends from the ground to the door or to a small open porch. When a porch is present, it is bordered by a waist-level railing of bamboo known as a sagang.

The bulwagan contains the living, dining, cooking, and sleeping areas of the house. It is traditionally a single multi-purpose open room. The bulwagan is designed to let in as much fresh air and natural light as possible. Smaller bahay kubo will often have bamboo slat floors (known as the sahig) which allow cool air to flow into the living space from the silong below (in which case the silong is not usually used for items which produce strong smells). A bahay kubo may be built without an atip (ceiling) so that hot air can rise straight into the large area just beneath the roof and out through strategically placed vents.

For daily activities like sleeping, sitting, or eating, the sahig are overlaid with banig mats made from woven pandanus or sedge leaves (among other materials).

==== Kitchen ====
The kitchen functions of a bahay kubo are provided by two substructures of the main floor: the abuhan and the batalán.

The abuhan (lit. "ash area") is an elevated area of the floor packed with soil. This area contains the fireplace with clay or stone trivets on which various cooking wares (like the palayok and the kawali) are placed to cook food. The abuhan also features various open shelves for storing firewood and cooking implements, as well as racks above the cooking area for smoking and preserving fish or meat (tinapa or tapa) or drying herbs.

The batalán (also called the pantaw), on the other hand, is a section of the main floor that projects outward from the main walls. It functions as the "wet area" of the house and as such has looser floorboards than the main living area to drain water faster. It contains water containers (banga or balanga) which are used for washing cooking implements, washing the hands/feet, or bathing children. It typically includes a secondary door with stairs leading outside as well as an elevated "sink" area. Some batalán can also be built on the ground level, with internal stairs connecting it to the main living area.

In modern bahay kubo designs, the abuhan is typically combined with the batalán. Modern batalán also usually have additional toilet and bathing facilities; though in pre-colonial times, toilets and bathing areas were generally not part of the main bahay kubo structure.

Batalán used for cooking and washing dishes are known as banggéra in Philippine Spanish (also bánggerahán, banguerahán or pingganan). It is named after the bangá earthen water-jars or pingan (meaning "plate").

=== Ground floor ===
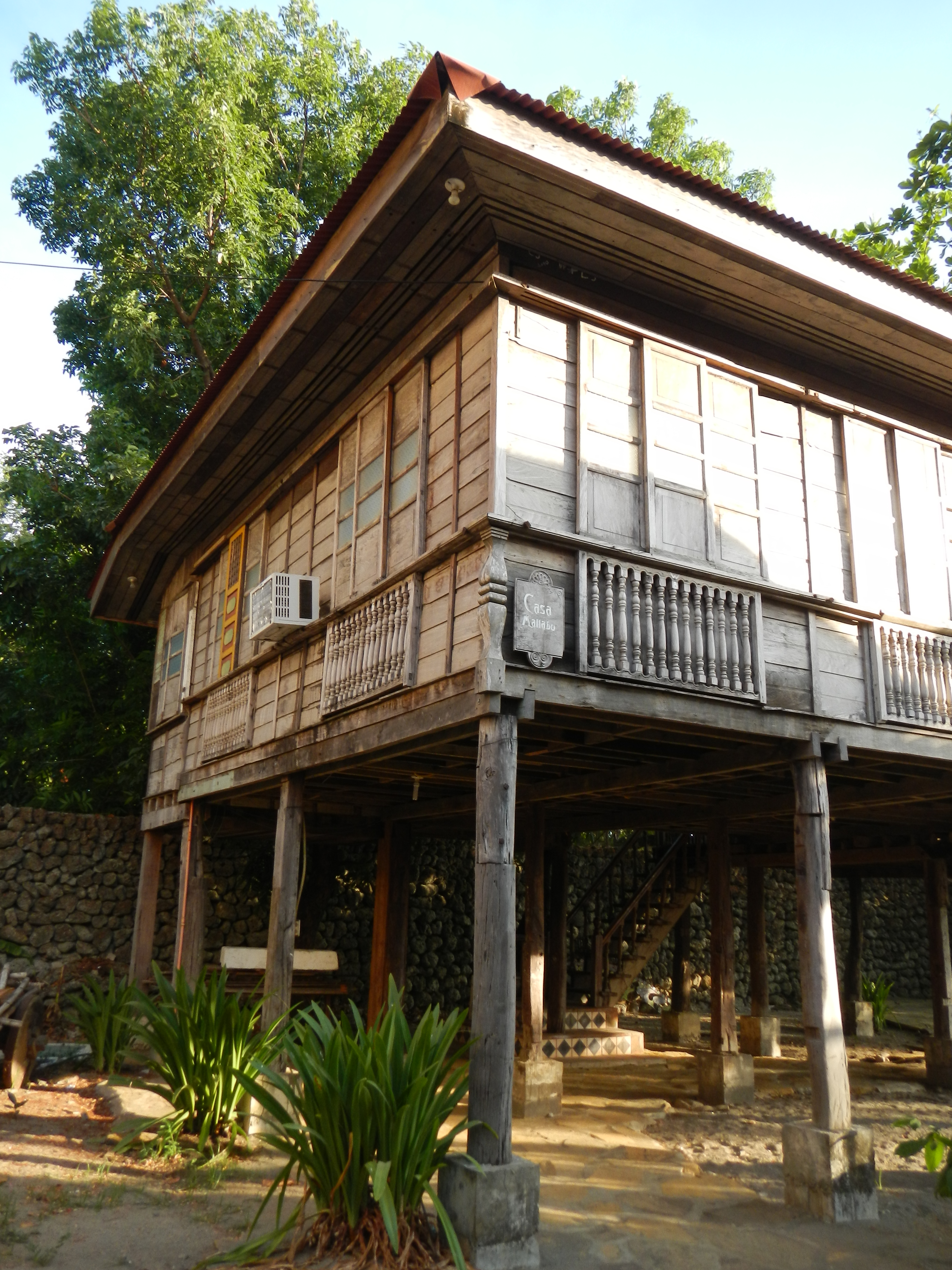
Bahay kubo, like most Austronesian houses have floors raised on stilts

The area beneath the main house posts ("stilts") of the bahay kubo is known as the silong (Tagalog for "shade" or "shelter"). It is situated directly beneath the living area. The silong is used to store harvested crops, tools, and other implements. It is also usually used to house livestock like chickens, pigs, or goats.

The entire silong is usually (but not always) enclosed by a loosely-spaced bamboo or wooden latticework or fence.

=== Granary ===
A granary detached from the house where harvested rice is kept is known as the kamálig.

== Cultural significance ==
A nipa hut is an icon of Philippine culture as it represents the Filipino value of bayanihan, which refers to a spirit of communal unity or effort to achieve an objective.

=== Arts ===
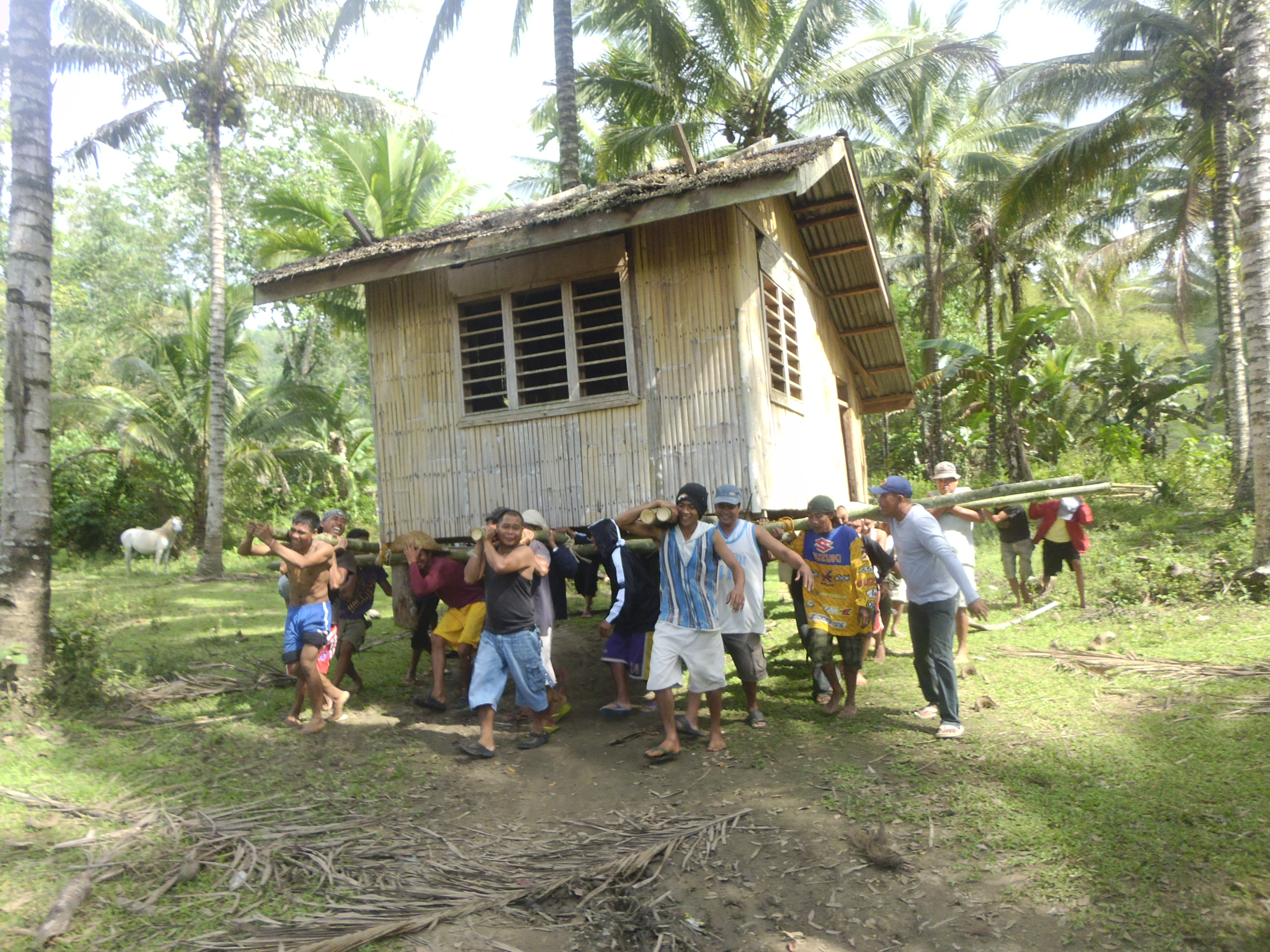
Community members practicing "bayanihan", working together to move a house to new location

A famous folk song, "Bahay Kubo", is often sung in schools, and is about a small house surrounded by vegetables, reading thus:

Bahay kubo, kahit munti,
ang halaman doon ay sari-sari:
singkamas at talong, sigarilyas at mani,
sitaw, bataw, patani,

Kundol, patola, upo't kalabasa,
At saka mayroon pang labanos, mustasa,
sibuyas, kamatis, bawang at luya.
Sa paligid-ligid ay puno ng linga.

The song is a generalization of what a nipa hut would have looked like during the pre-colonial era: a house surrounded by locally cultivated plants. This does not take into account the early and diverse variants of native royalties, particularly those of the Mindanao region which has heavy Islamic architectural influences.

== Legacy ==
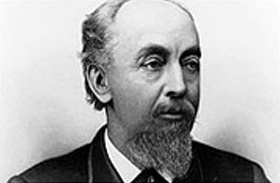
William Le Baron Jenney

American architect and engineer William Le Baron Jenney visited the Philippines for three months in 1850. He noticed that during a storm, bahay kubo structures are very "light and flexible"; they only seem to dance and sway through storms. This inspired him to emulate the flexibility of bahay kubo in 1879 when he built the first lighter building. In 1884, he built the Home Insurance Building in Chicago, the first metal-framed skyscraper in the United States. Because of this, he became known as "The Father of Modern American Skyscrapers", and the Home Insurance building would become the predecessor of all the modern skyscrapers in the world, showing how important the bahay kubo is in history.

The bahay kubo also inspired architects such as Francisco Mañosa and Leandro Locsin by incorporating elements of the bahay na bato into their own designs especially seen in Cultural Center of the Philippines, National Arts Center, Coconut Palace, and Light Rail Transit stations.

== Similar architecture ==
The báhay kúbo is an example of Austronesian architecture. Various other similar but different vernacular architecture among other ethnic groups in the Philippines are also sometimes incorrectly referred to as báhay kúbo.

These include the jinjin, kamadid, and rahaung of the Ivatan people; the balai and binuron of the Apayao people; the afung (also fayu or katyufong), pabafunan, and ator of the Bontoc people; the bale or fale of the Ifugao people; the foruy and finaryon (also binayon), of the Kalinga people; the baey, binangiyan, and tinokbob of the Kankanaey people; the babayan of the Ibaloi people; the baley of the Matigsalug people; the binanwa of the Ata Manobo; the bolloy of the Klata Manobo; the baoy of the Obo Manobo; the bale of the Bagobo Tagabawa; the bong-gumne of the Blaan people; the uyaanan of the Mansaka people; the guno-bong of the Tboli people; the lawig, mala-a-walai, langgal, lamin, and torogan of the Maranao people; the bay sinug of the Tausug people; the lumah of the Yakan people; and the balay of the Sama-Bajau people, among others.

Versions of the báhay kúbo (and other native houses) built on very tall trees are also common among some ethnic groups in the Philippines, often referred to in European literature as "tree houses".

== See also ==
- Ancestral houses of the Philippines
- Architecture of the Philippines
- Kawayan Torogan
- Las Casas Filipinas de Acuzar
- Torogan
- Rumah Melayu
- Rumah adat
- Vernacular architecture
