= Palayok =

Type of pot

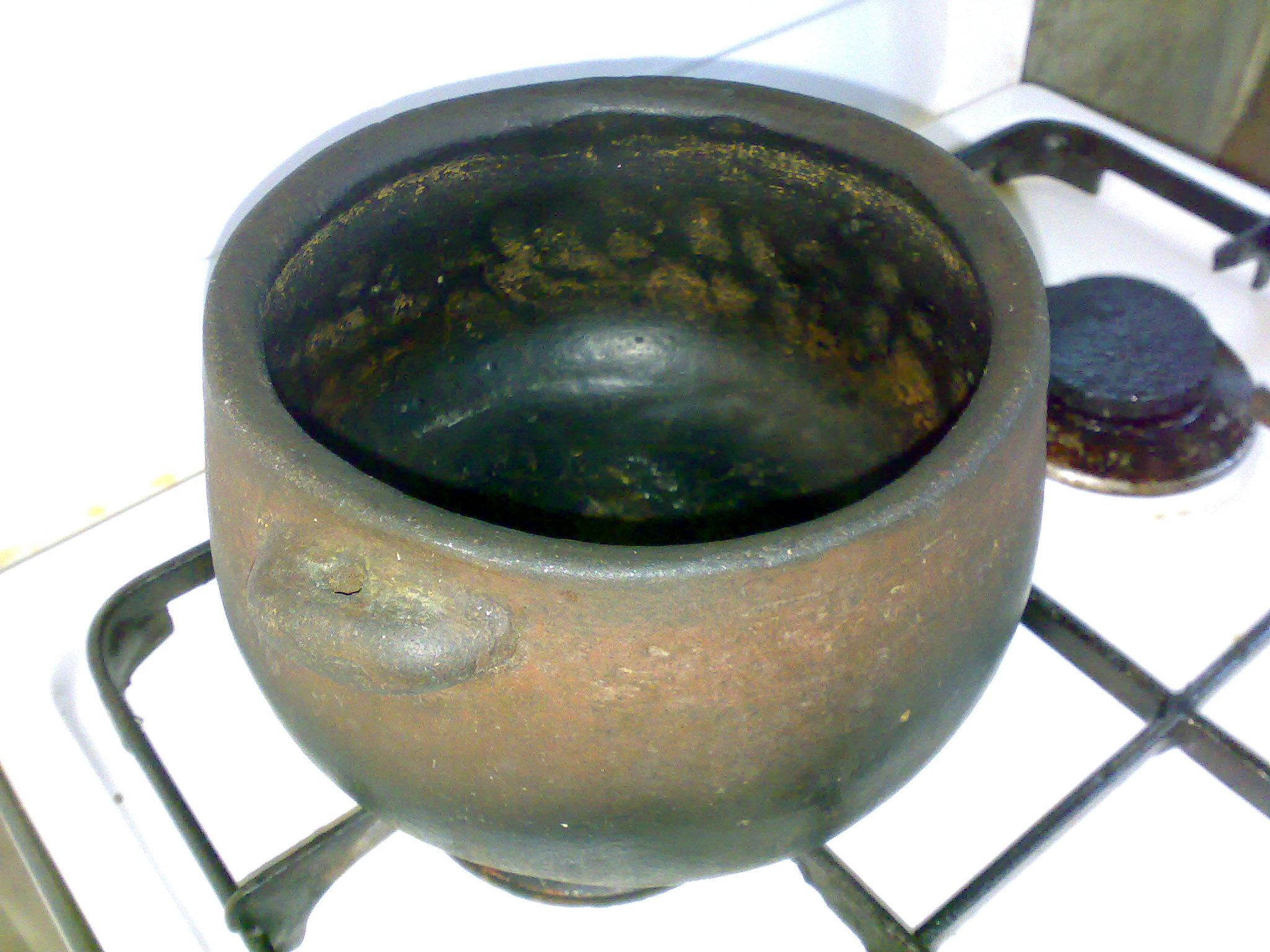
An anglit, a small palayok

A palayók is a clay pot used as the traditional food preparation container in the Philippines. Palayók is a Tagalog word; in other parts of the country, especially in the Visayas, it is called a kulon, with smaller-sized pots termed anglit. Neighboring Indonesia and Malaysia refer to such a vessel as a periuk.

== Cooking in a palayok ==
The palayók is typically made of earthenware, a porous ceramic material. This allows steam from cooking to evaporate out of the pores in the earthenware. Juices from the cooking food would not begin to burn until all the water has evaporated, after which the food is thoroughly cooked. Since ceramic does not transfer heat as much as metal, cooking in a palayók entails a longer cooking time and higher temperature than would normally be used with metal cookware.

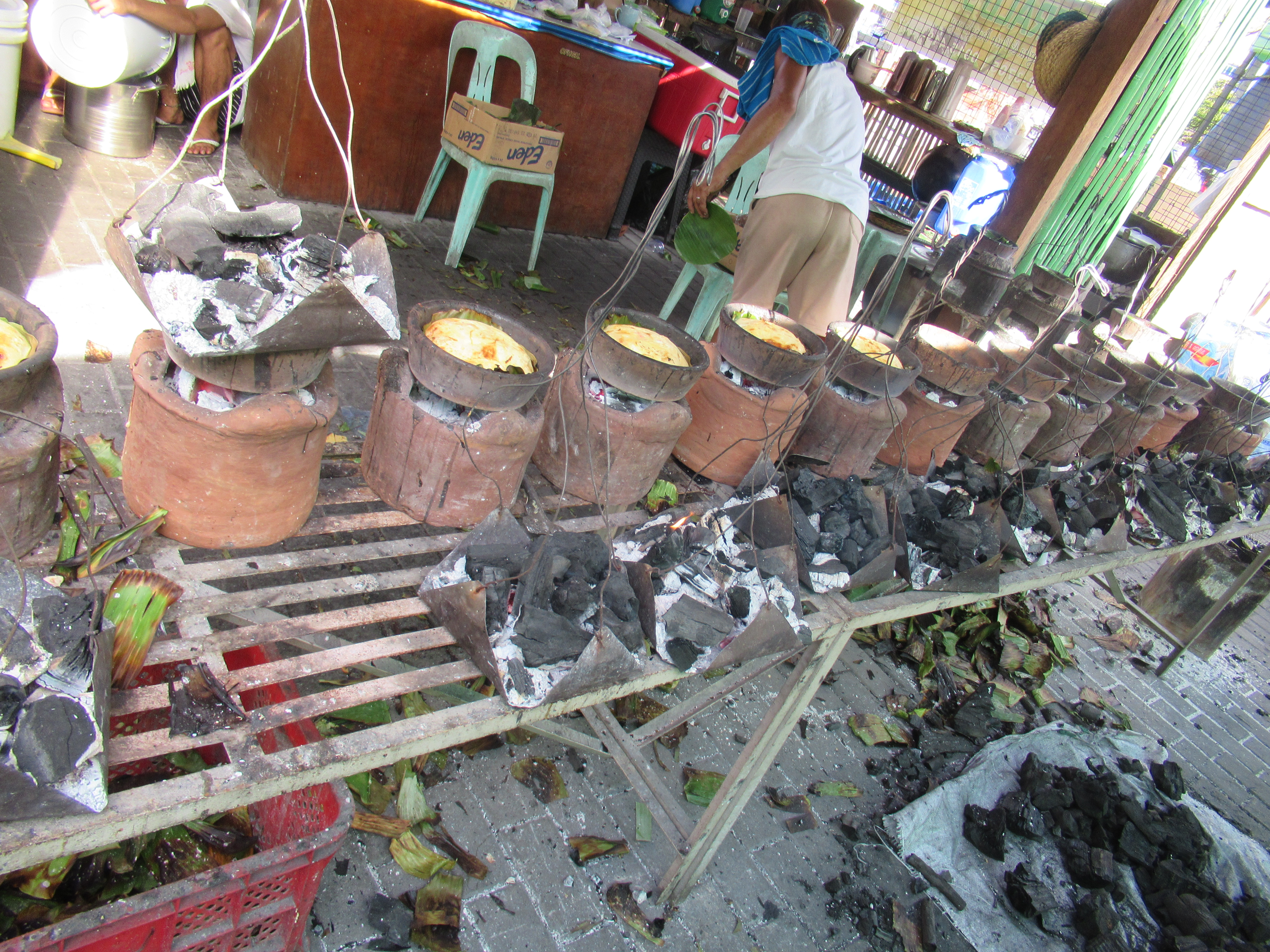
Palayok & bibingka.

The palayók is not to be cleaned using household detergents, as the porous material would easily absorb chemicals that would later impart unwanted flavors to the food. It is instead cleaned by soaking in warm water, and when the detritus has sufficiently softened, scrubbed with salt.

Filipino cuisine expert Maria Orosa is credited with turning the earthenware pot into an oven. Called the "Palayok Oven", the contraption consists of a palayok fitted with a piece of thin sheet metal cut to fit the bottom of the pot, and a piece of aluminum foil placed below the lid. These metal pieces are designed to reflect heat back into the pot. The pot is then heated by using a native pugón or kalán, a small wood-fired stove similar to a Japanese shichirin.

== See also ==
- Tapayan
- List of cooking vessels
