= Dirty kitchen =

Annex kitchen in the Philippines

In the Philippines, a dirty kitchen refers to an outdoor, often additional, kitchen. It is made either separate from or adjoining the "main house" as an annex, with the reasons for its separation including fire safety and isolating from the main rooms the odor of raw seafood or meat being prepared as well as the smell of spices and certain condiments for such pungent dishes as the sisig. The annex also keeps out smoke, fuel smell, charcoal dust, oil splashes and grime, and, just as significantly, kitchen ants. As a house feature in a hot country, the dirty kitchen also keeps the heat from the cooking activity itself out of the house's main area.

Apart from its main application, the dirty kitchen also often doubles as an ideal space for additional washing of clothes, due to its proximity to the outdoors.

In recent years, some designers have observed a diminishing relevance of the traditional domestic kitchen, particularly in small or limited-budget housing units. This shift is attributed to the high initial cost of building and equipping a kitchen (including cabinetry and appliances), which now significantly outweighs the cumulative cost of continuous food ordering through modern delivery services. This evolution suggests that the primary function of the kitchen may fade from the interior landscape, opening the possibility for shrinking dedicated food preparation spaces or repurposing them for other uses.

Some designers avoid the term Dirty Kitchen, preferring the professional alternatives Chef's Kitchen or Prep Kitchen to emphasize function.
