= Tapayan =

Earthenware or stoneware jars

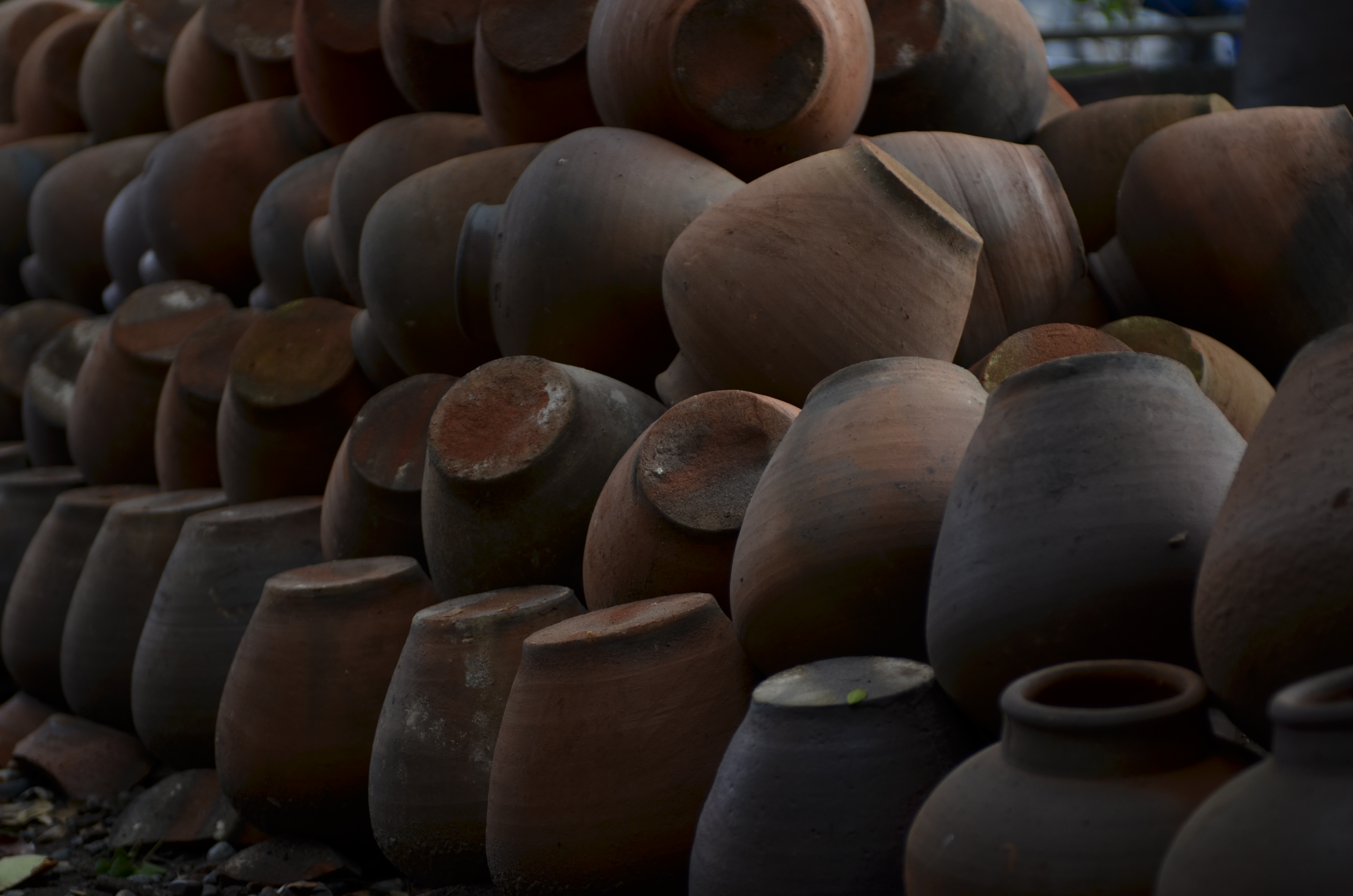
Traditional tapayan jars in Vigan, Philippines

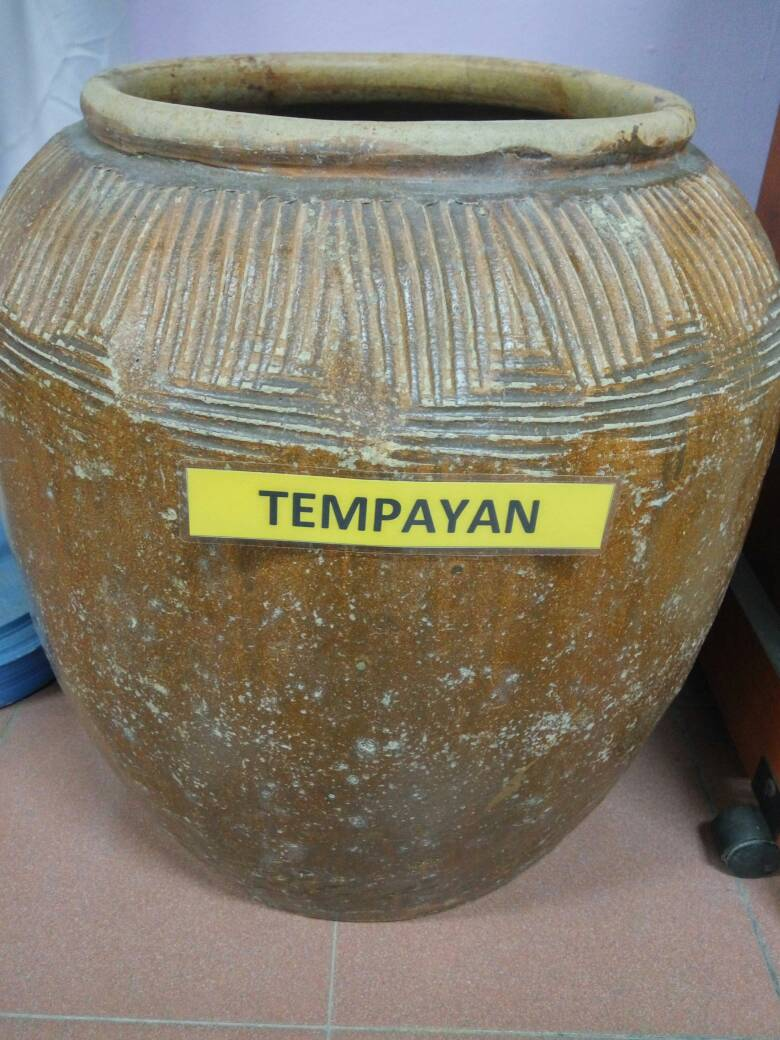
A Malay tempayan

Tapáyan or tempayan (also known as balanga, belanga, or bangâ) are large wide-mouthed earthenware or stoneware jars found in various Austronesian cultures in island Southeast Asia. Their various functions include fermenting rice (tapai), fermenting vinegar or alcoholic beverages, storing food and water, cooking, and burial of the deceased.

The term tapayan also includes the imported martaban stoneware (Dutch: martavanen), originally from kilns in Southern China and Indochina. These were used primarily as storage jars for foodstuffs and valuable trade goods during ship voyages, but were highly valued as trade goods themselves. They became heirlooms and symbols of wealth and status among various indigenous cultures in the islands of Southeast Asia.

== Etymology ==
Tapayan is derived from Proto-Malayo-Polynesian *tapay-an which refers to large earthen jars originally used to ferment rice wine (tapai). In modern Austronesian languages, derivatives include tapayan (Tagalog, Ilocano and various Visayan languages), tapj-an (Ibaloi), and tapáy-an (Hanunó'o) in the Philippines; and tepayan (Iban) and tempayan (Javanese and Malay) in Brunei, Malaysia, and Indonesia.

Balanga is derived from Proto-Philippine *balangaw ('water jar'). Cognates include balanga and banga (Tagalog, Ilocano, Pangasinan, most Visayan languages), vangaq (Ivatan), byanga (Kalinga), and balangaw (Kapampangan) in the Philippines; and balanga, belanga, or blanga in Indonesia and Malaysia.

== Description ==
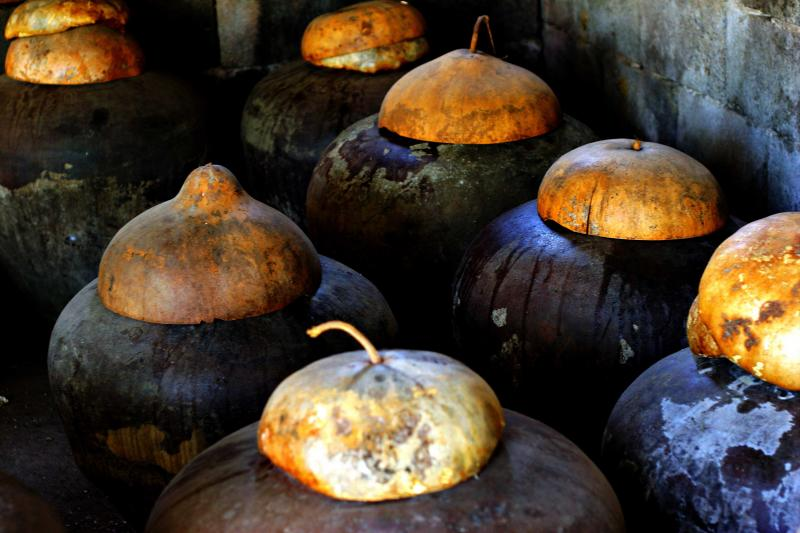
Traditional burnay jars containing fermenting bagoong in Ilocos Norte, Philippines

Tapayan jars range in size from 30 cm (12 in) to larger than 100 cm (3.3 ft). They typically have bulbous "shoulders" and flat unadorned bases. Horizontal (lug) or vertical handles may be present, to a maximum of eight. The mouth of the jars were typically wide, but jars used for storing wine can have relatively smaller mouths and were tightly covered to prevent the alcohol from evaporating. Early native tapayan were mostly unglazed, while later tapayan and imported martaban were glazed (usually on the outside) and were thus more suited for storing liquids.

=== Philippines ===
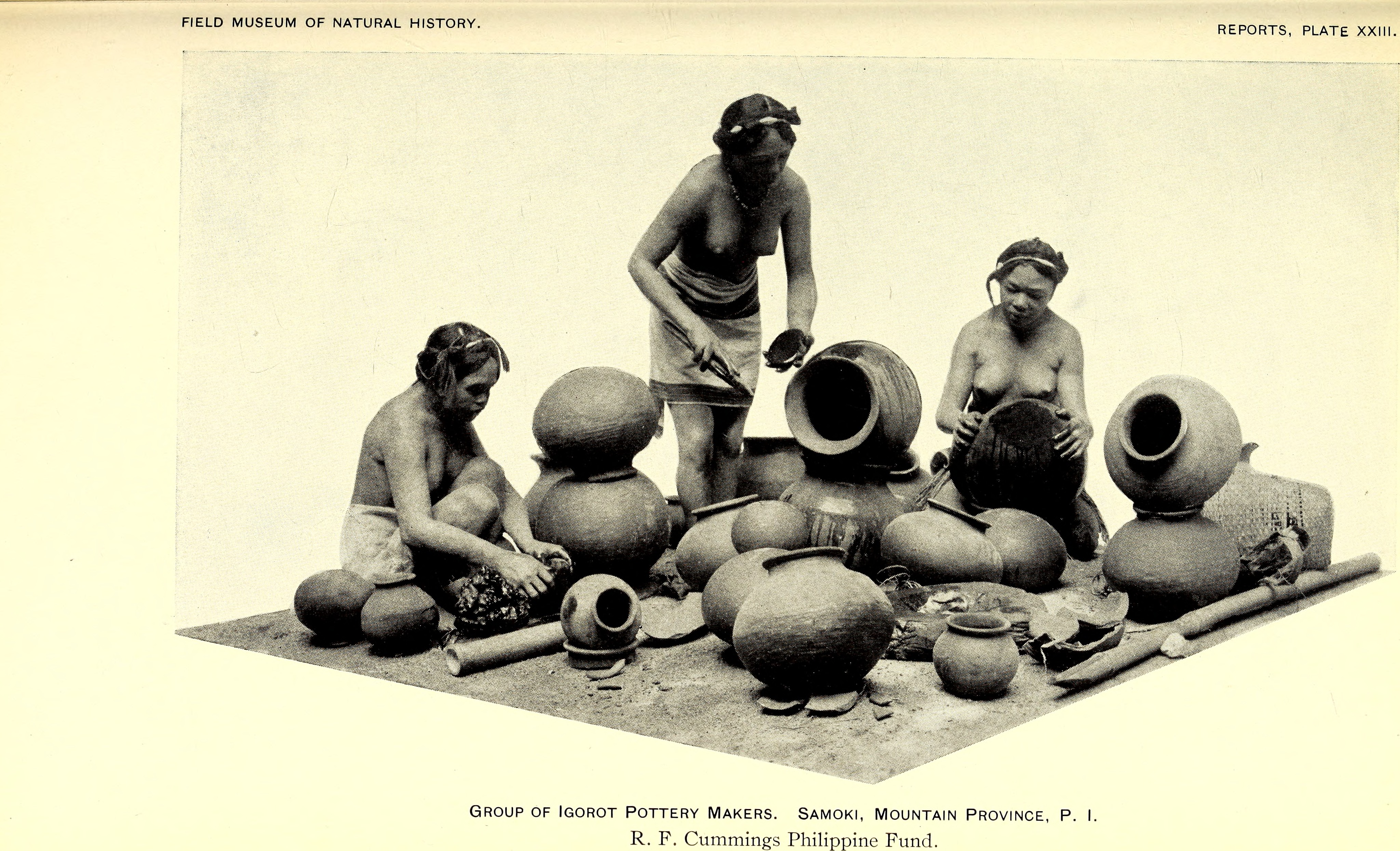
Igorot pottery makers (c. 1910)

Tapayan in the Philippines are most commonly used for water storage, fermentation, and cooking. Tapayan was distinguished from the much smaller cooking clay pot (palayok or kulon). Tapayan are also known as kalamba or angang in Tagalog and Itawis.

Tapayan used exclusively for storing water are sometimes called banga or balanga, to distinguish them from other tapayan. Banga were an essential part of traditional Filipino kitchens and were normally kept in the banggera, the kitchen counter made of slatted bamboo that extends from the outer walls of the house. Specialized tapayan used for fermenting food products, with thicker walls and an airtight cover, are also distinguished as burnay in Ilocano.

=== Indonesia, Malaysia, and Brunei ===
Tempayan jars (also known as tempajan, kendi, balanga, belanga, or blanga) in Indonesia, Malaysia, and Brunei were also used primarily for water storage, fermentation, and cooking.

== Jar burial ==
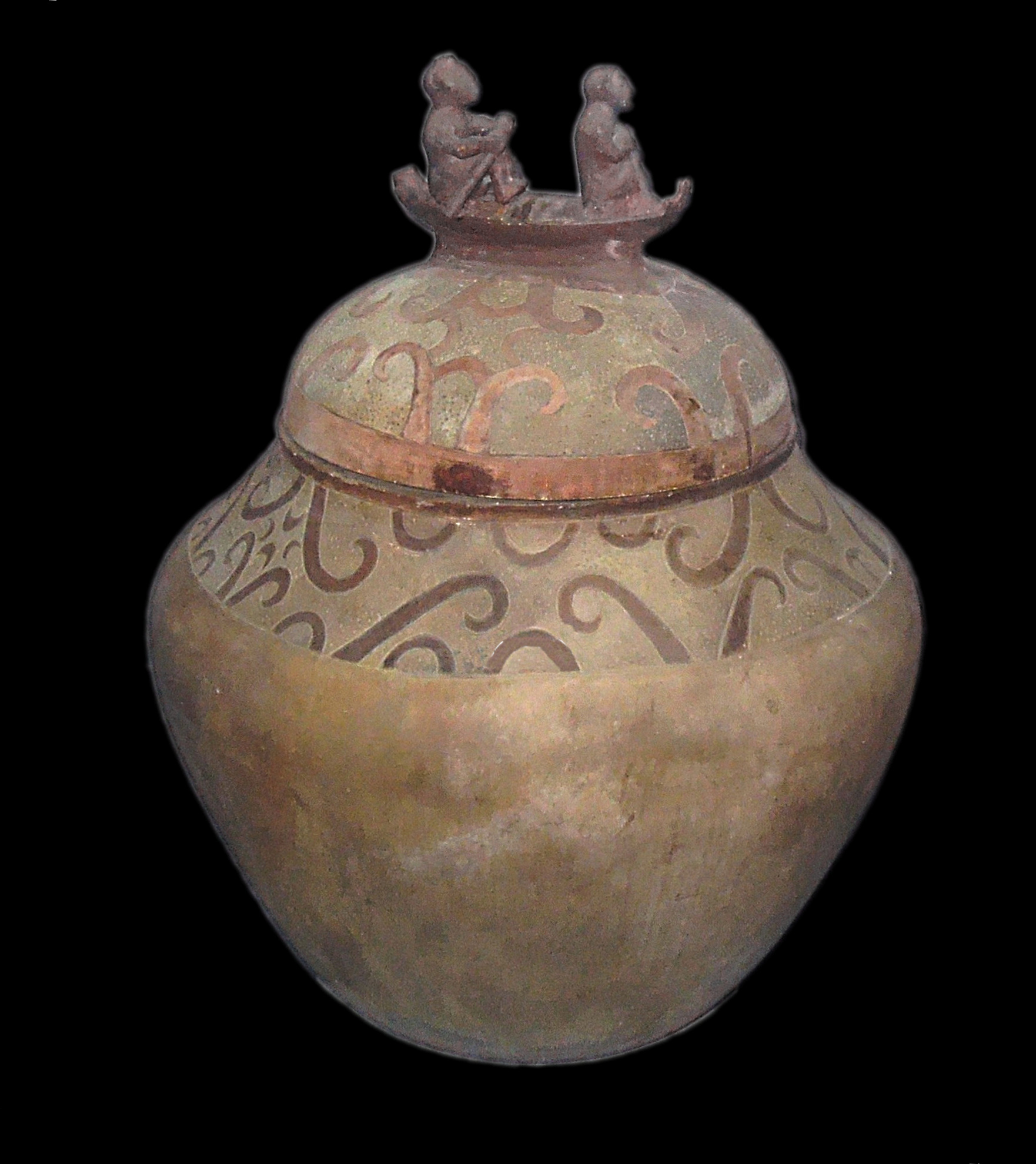
The Manunggul Jar, a burial tapayan from Palawan dated to 890-710 BCE

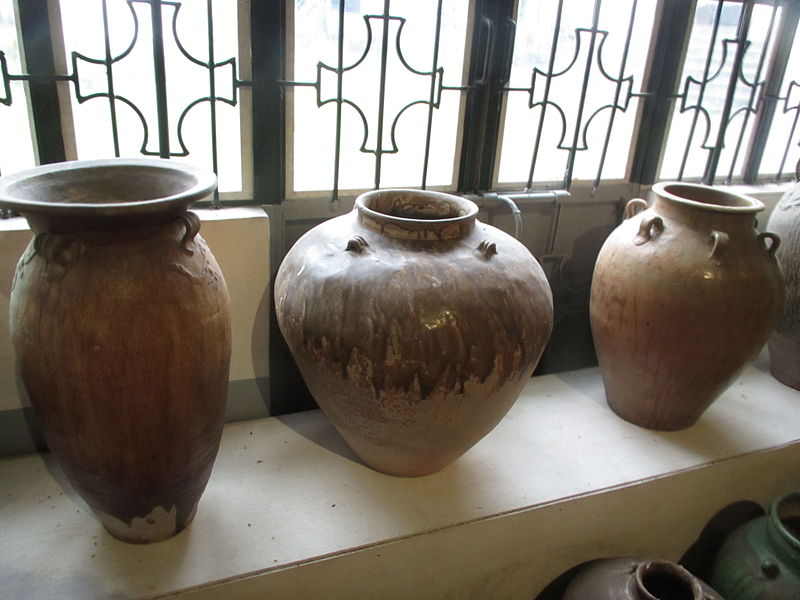
Various burial tapayan displayed in the Museo del Seminario Conciliar de Nueva Caceres of Bicol

Tapayan as well as other more specialized urns, are also used as funerary jars in ancient Austronesian cultures. They are used to store the skeletal remains of deceased people. The oldest example of which is the ornate Manunggul Jar, dated 890-710 BCE, from the Tabon Caves of Palawan, Philippines.

== Trade ==
=== Martaban jars ===
Martaban glazed stoneware were usually imported. They were originally stoneware made in Southern China from at least the Han dynasty period (206 BCE - 220 CE), but in later centuries also included stoneware made in Thailand, Myanmar, Cambodia, Laos, Vietnam, and island Southeast Asia itself by natives and Chinese migrants. The name martaban is from the port city of Martaban (modern Mottama, Myanmar) an important trading port in the Maritime Silk Road. The term martaban is also used in the Near East (and may be the source of the terms for marzipan), but in contrast to Southeast Asian martaban, they referred to Chinese celadon greenware. Vietnamese stoneware were also sometimes distinguished from martaban as guci (also gusi, gusih, guchi, or gutchi) from Giao Chỉ, the old name for northern Vietnam, while Thai stoneware were distinguished as syam, from Siam or Sayam, the old name of Thailand.

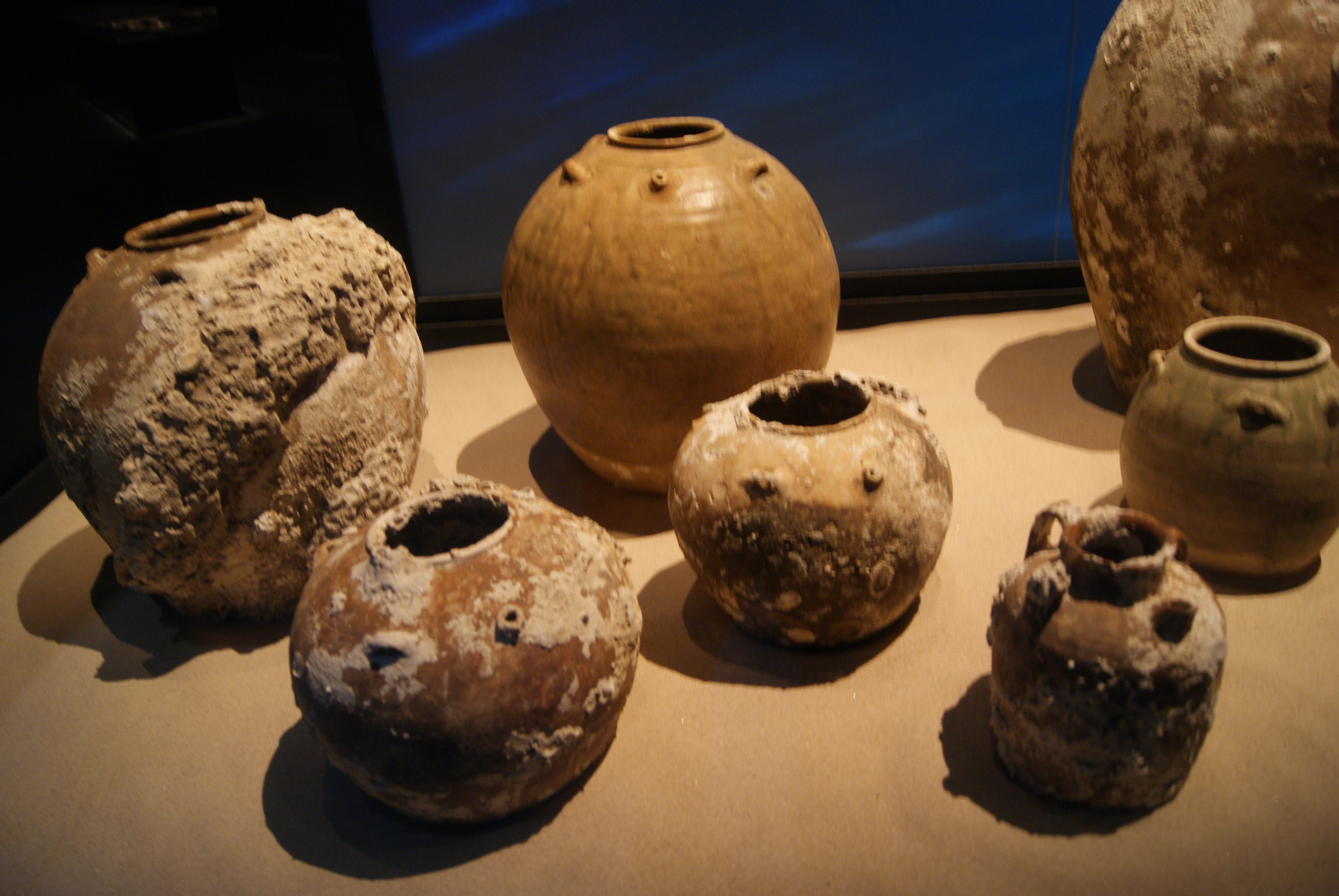
Various 9th century martaban from the Belitung shipwreck of Indonesia

Martaban were used primarily as storage jars for foodstuffs (like grain, wine, candied fruits, and spices) and valuable trade goods (like opium and oils) during ship voyages. But they became highly valued as trade goods themselves by the natives, even more so than the Kraak and Swatow porcelain favored by European traders. The jars (and their contents) were traded to the natives for luxury goods from Southeast Asia like resin, gum, bird's nest, trepang (sea cucumbers), and pearls. Because of their high value, martaban are typically not used for everyday purposes by Austronesian cultures unlike ordinary tapayan.

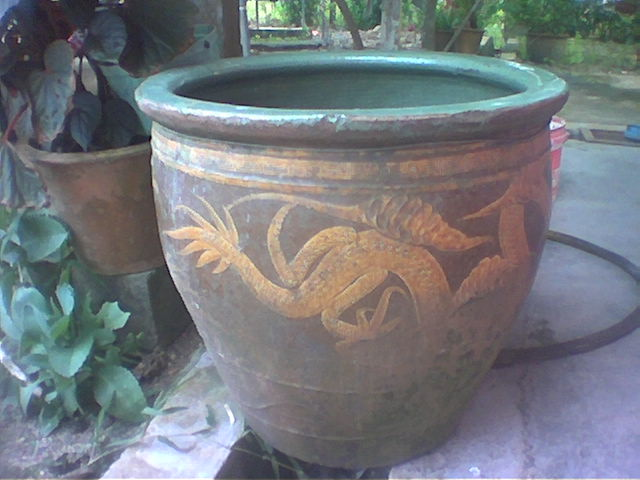
A Dayak "dragon jar" tempayan in Malaysia

Martaban were treated heirlooms and symbols of wealth and status among various indigenous cultures in the islands of Southeast Asia. They were often displayed in the houses of nobles and prominent families. There can be such a profusion of them that the Scottish navigator Thomas Forrester once described the audience room of a datu in Luzon as having the "appearance of a china shop", due to around thirty martaban being displayed prominently in shelves. Among the Iban people of Borneo, the most valuable martaban were equivalent to the value of a male slave. Smashing one accidentally can result in the offender becoming enslaved by the jar's owner, unless they can replace it with a jar of similar value as well as additional compensation.

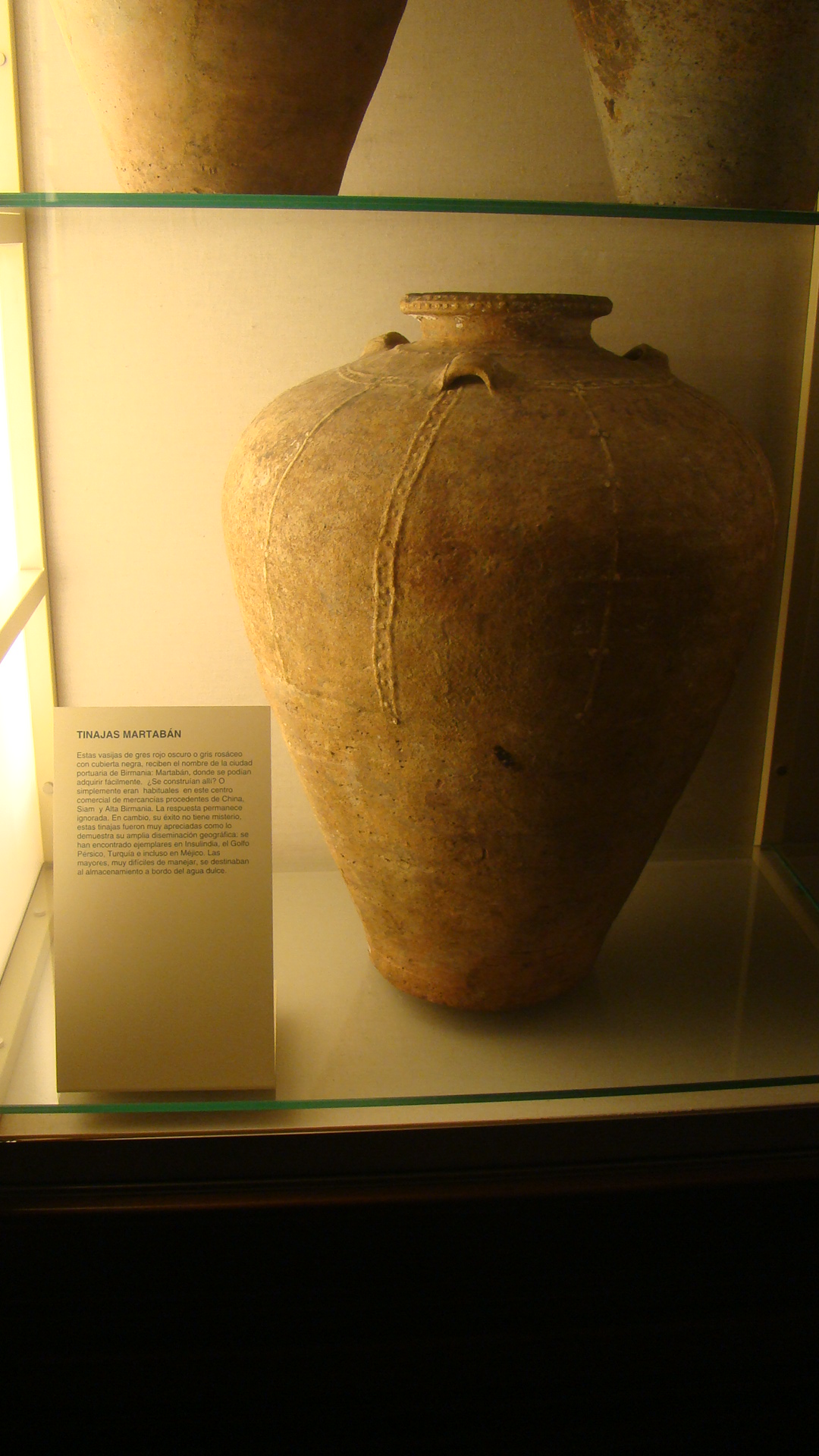
A martaban in the Naval Museum of Madrid

Another notable example are the balanga of the Dayak people. Originally from China, they typically had very large mouths and were are somewhat conical in shape. They usually featured dragon designs hence they are sometimes referred to as "dragon jars". They were prized as heirlooms (pusaka or pesaka) and in recent times have become a symbol of "Dayakness".

Aside from monetary value, martaban also had great spiritual and symbolic value. Inheritance of specific jars can mean inheritance of the social status of the bequeather as well, especially among aristocratic families. They can also be used to seal peace treaties and agreements across different tribes.

Some jars have become integrated into native religious ceremonies like marriage rituals, funerals, and ancestor worship. They have also become associated with native myths, especially in connection to the animistic underworld. Some are regarded to have acquired their own "souls" (Filipino anito, Iban antu, etc.) and were anthropomorphized as having characteristics like genders and personal names, especially the "talking jars" of the Philippines, which could purportedly talk, roam around, and shapeshift. They were even regarded as being "married" to other jars and having "child" jars.

=== Rusun jars ===
Rusun jars (Japanese: 呂宋壺, Hepburn: Rusun tsubo), also known as "Luzon jars", were dark-brown to purple-black tapayan from the island of Luzon in the northern Philippines. These were highly sought after by Japanese traders in the 16th century Nanban trade and remain as valuable antique heirlooms in modern Japan. They are primarily used for the Japanese tea ceremony (chanoyu). They were prized for their simplicity and rough, often uneven design, epitomizing the traditional Japanese aesthetics of wabi-sabi ("perfection in imperfection").

The Spanish historian Antonio de Morga in his Sucesos de la Islas Filipinas (1609) described Rusun jars as thus:

In this island of Luzon, especially in the provinces of Manila, Pampanga, Pangasinan and Ylocos the natives have ancient earthenware jars (tibores) which are brown in color and not especially attractive to look at. Some of these are medium-sized, others smaller, and they have certain marks and stamps on them but no one knows how to explain these, nor knows whence they came nor when, for they are no longer imported or made here. The Japanese seek them and think highly of them, for they have discovered that the root [sic] of a certain plant called cha (tea), which the kings and lords of Japan drink hot, both as a refreshment and medicine, can best be kept and preserved in these jars. Hence throughout Japan these jars are regarded highly as being the most precious jewels of their inner rooms and chambers, and the Japanese adorn them on the outside with fine, elegantly wrought gold and keep them in brocade cases. One of them is worth a great sum there, for some jars are valued at, and sold for, two thousand taels at the rate of eleven reales per tael. It makes no difference whether they be cracked or chipped, for that does not prevent them from holding cha. The natives of these islands sell them to the Japanese for the best possible price and they are diligent in seeking them out for the sake of the profit to be made. However, few are to be found these days because of the zeal with which they have been sought up to the present.

Rusun jars were part of what is collectively known as Mishima ("three islands") ware. With the other two islands being indigenous Taiwan and the unidentified "Amakawa".

== See also ==
- Philippine ceramics
- Tapai
- Tapuy
- Maritime Silk Road
- Amphora
- List of cooking vessels
