= Philippine ceramics =

Ceramic art in Philippine

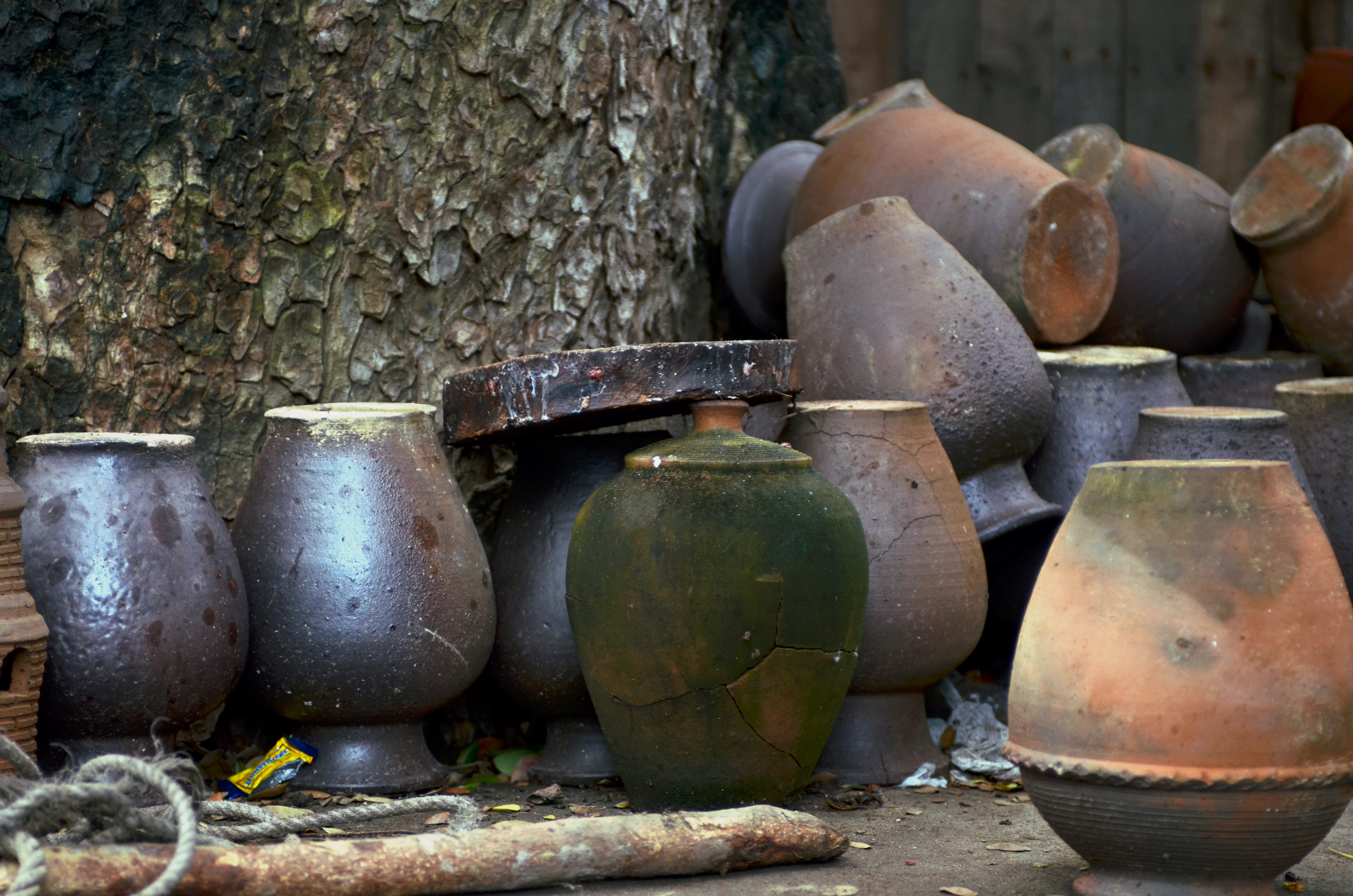
Pottery from Vigan

Philippine ceramics refers to ceramic art and pottery designed or produced as a form of Philippine art.

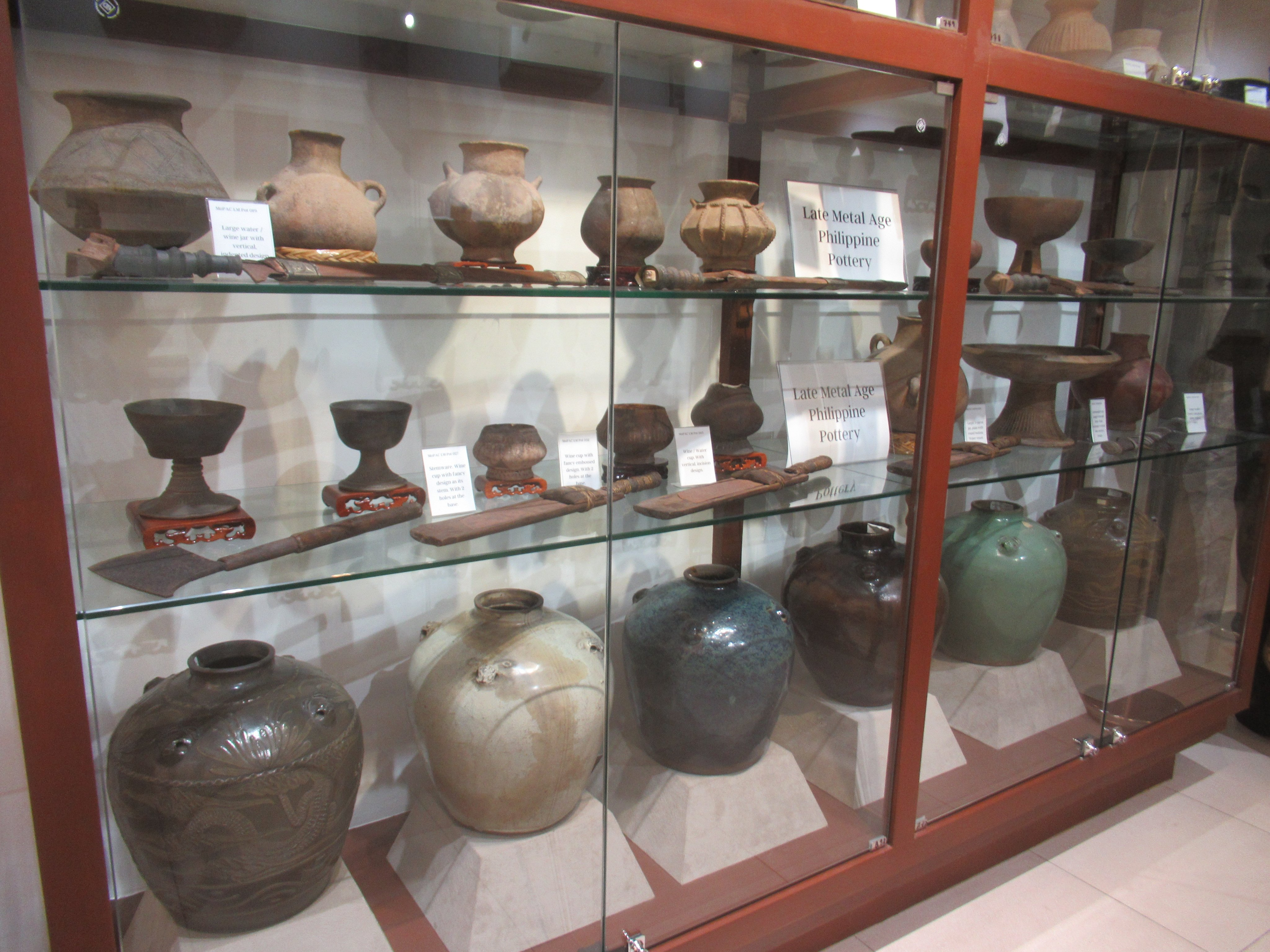
Prehistory of the Philippines late metal age in a museum

== History ==
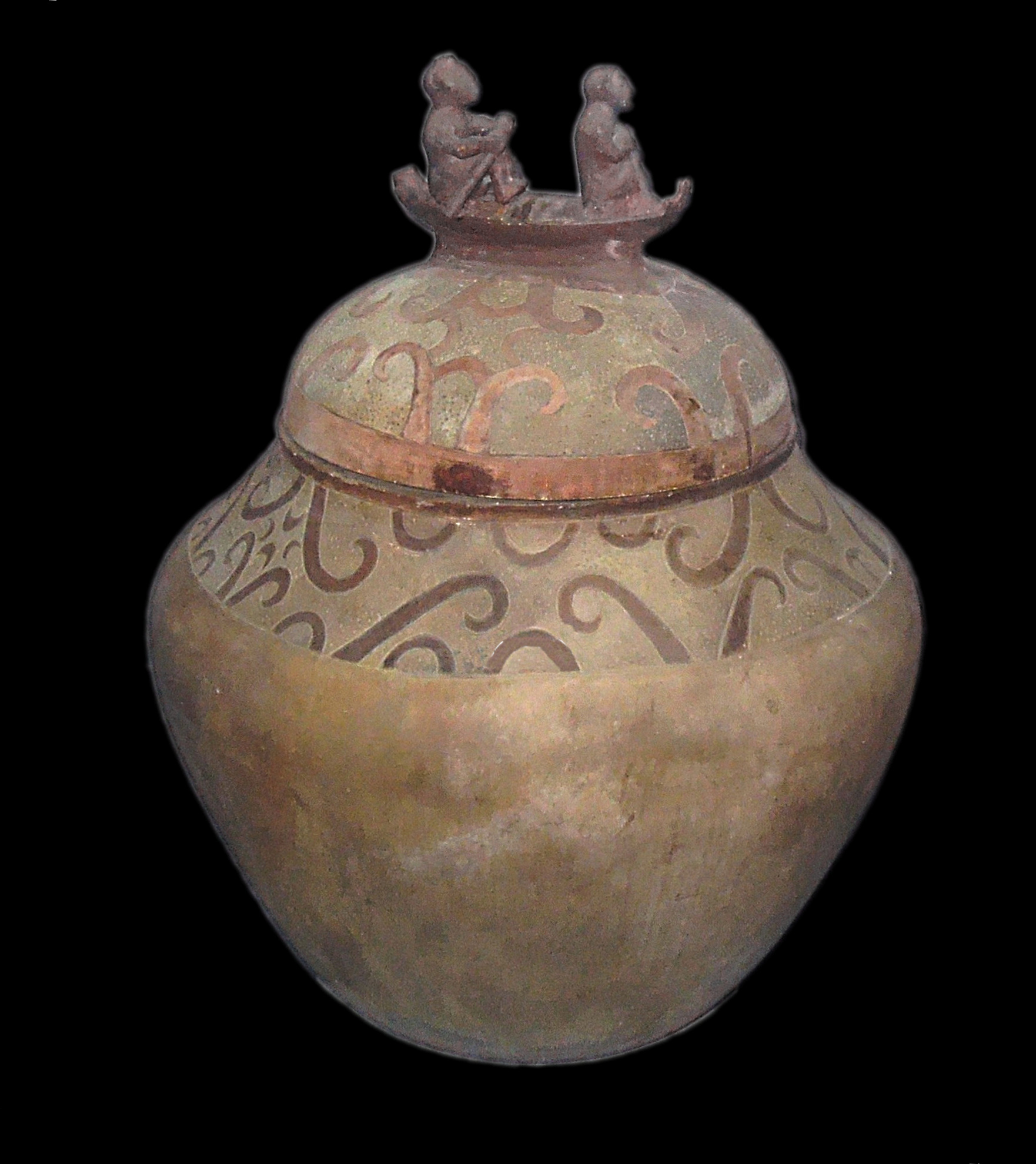
Late Neolithic Manunggul Jar used for burial, topped with two figures, Manunggul Cave

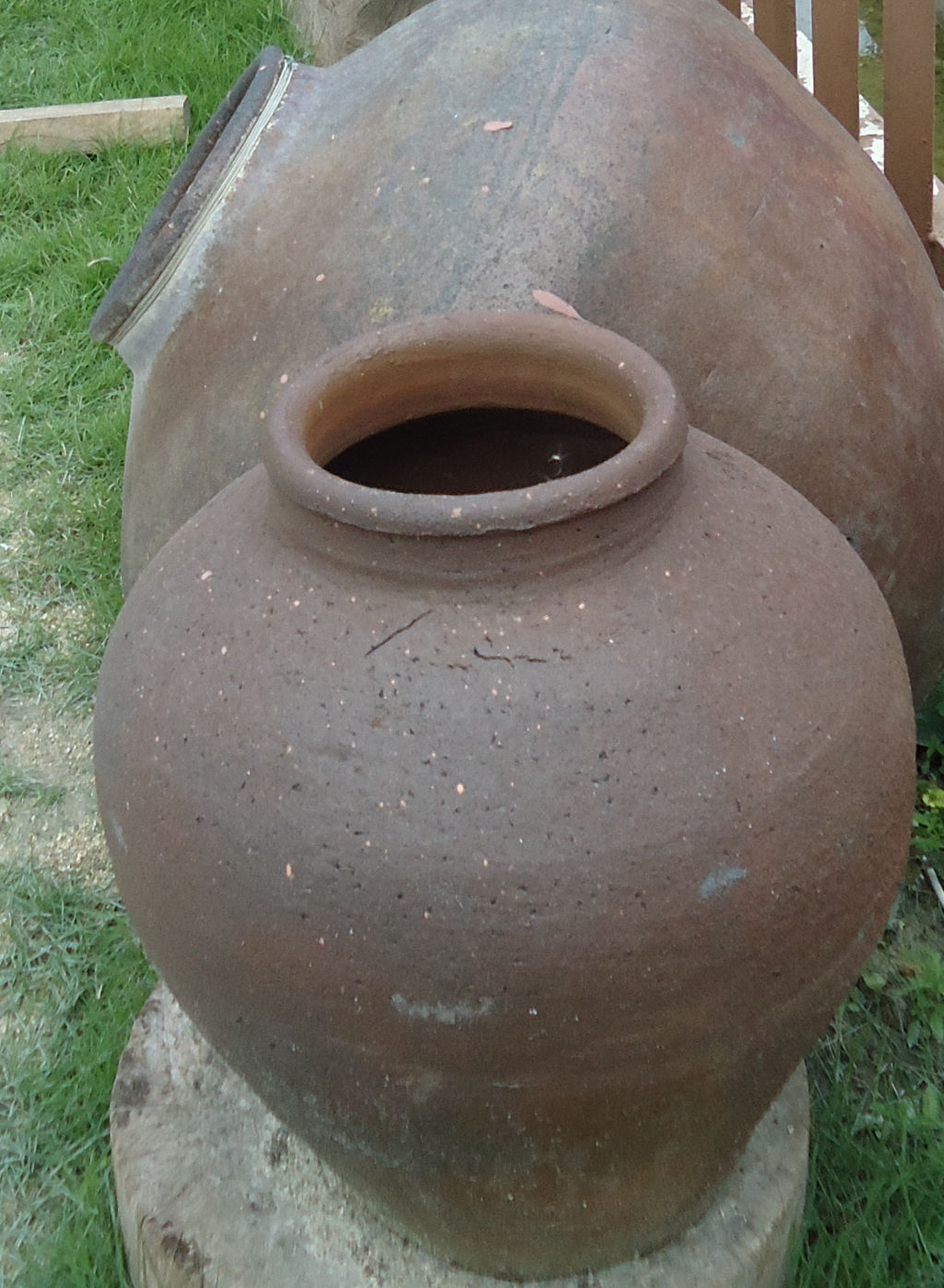
Tapayan jars

Traditional pot-making in certain areas of the Philippines would use clay found near the Sibalom River. Molding the clay required the use of wooden paddles, and the clay had to be kept away from sunlight.

Native Filipinos created pottery since 4200 years ago. They used these ceramic jars to hold the deceased.

Other pottery used to hold remains of the deceased were decorated with anthropomorphic designs. These anthropomorphic earthenware pots date back to 5 BC. - 225 A.D and had pot covers shaped like human heads.

Filipino pottery had other uses as well. During the Neolithic period of the Philippines, pottery was made for water vessels, plates, cups, and for many other uses.

Kalinga Pottery

Ceramic vessels of Kalinga are divided into three types: rice cooking (ittoyom), vegetable/meat cooking (oppaya), and water storage (immosso) pots. According to Skibo, the rice cooking pots are usually larger, thinner and have a smaller opening than vegetable/meat pots. On the other hand, water storage pots have an average and uniform size and a smaller neck size.

Except for water storage pots, which have a uniform size, the other two kinds can come in three different sizes, large, medium and small. Although this is true in some cases, another larger type of vegetable/meat pot and smaller water storage pot exists.

• Manufacture of Kalinga potteries

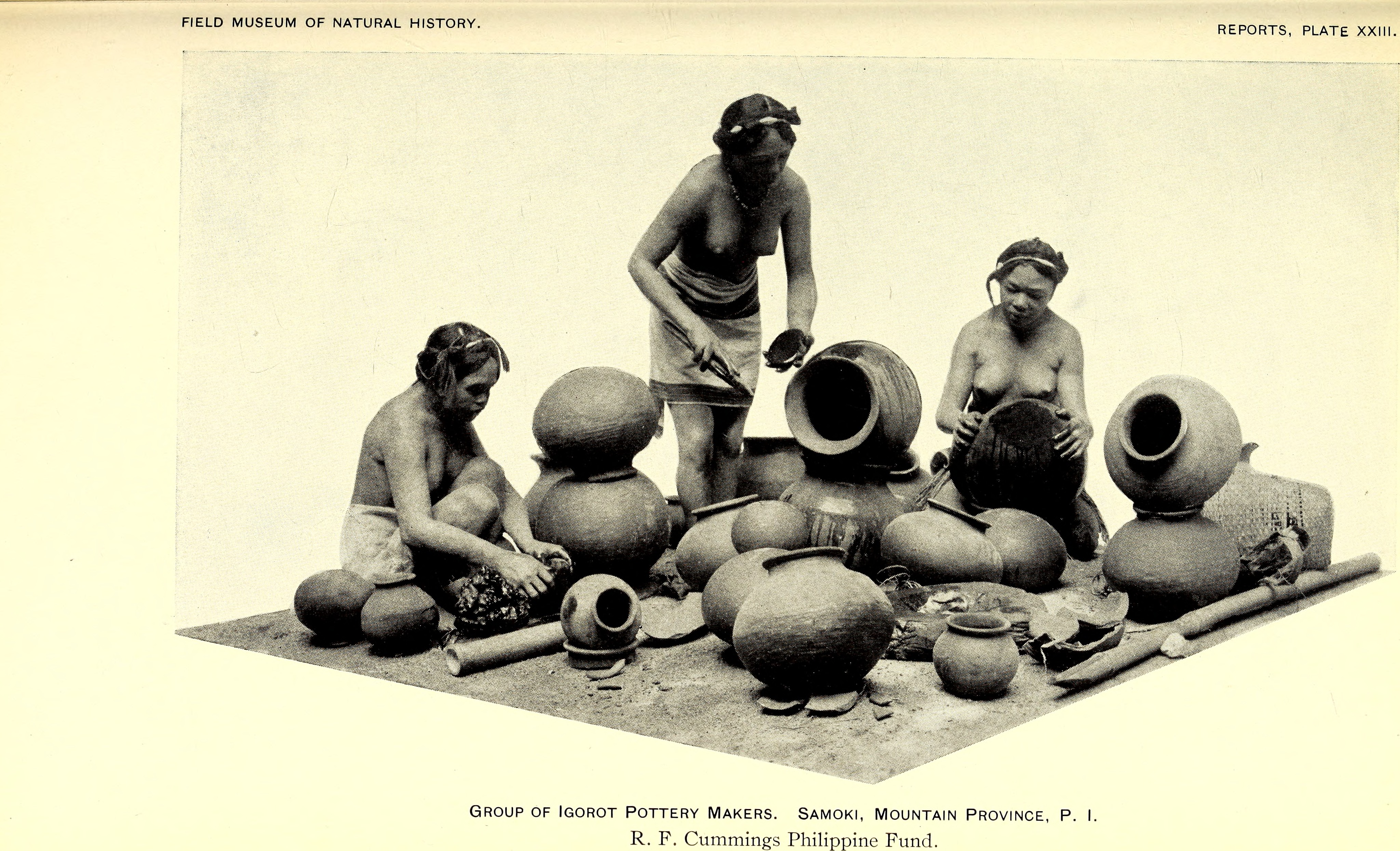
Group of Igorot pottery makers, from Samoki, Mountain Province (1910)

The first step in the manufacture of pots is the acquisition of the starting material, clay. The clay is then pounded, added with enough amount of water, to reach the wanted flexibility, and placed in a rotating plate. Using the hand-modeling and coil-and-scrape techniques, the height, thickness and shape of the pot is established. After this, the rim is designed by placing a wet rag on top of it and then rotating it in the other direction. Furthermore, scraping of the walls can also be done if the walls produced are too thick.

The pot, after the modeling stage, is then dried for a short period of time before the base is shaped. Also, after additional heating, small amounts of clay are added inside and outside the clay to maintain the evenness of the surface. A polishing step can also be done through the use of a polishing stone. In some cases, pots are also painted with red hematite paint for some stylized design.

Pottery Functions

Pots are ceramic vessels that are made by molding clay into its wanted shape and then leaving it in an environment with an elevated temperature thereby making it solid and sturdy. It is widely recognized as one of better tools that humans invented since it managed to store the surplus of food Neolithic humans gathered.

In the book Pottery Function: A Use-Alteration Perspective, the author, James Skibo, reasoned out why the use of pots is far more advantageous than baskets and other organic containers. He said that since potteries are commonly made in clay, heat has little to none effect on the container, and its contents, and that it protects the food from moisture and pests. Furthermore, its range of storable contents is far wider than baskets and animal skins since it can store both liquid and dry goods.

Also, Rice, in his book Pottery Analysis, classified ceramic vessels into 17 categories depending on various factors that concern the use and production of the tool. One of these is the content wherein he further divided a type of pot into four depending on the state (liquid or solid) and temperature (hot or cold) of the food inside it. He also said that a ceramic has three main uses. These three are storage, processing, and transfer.

Based from these three uses that Rice gave, Skibo further characterized the usage of ceramic vessels by dividing the tool's function into two, (1) intended use and (2) actual use.

Intended use, as the name implies, is how the tool's supposed to be used. This is the basis of the manufacture of the ceramic vessel since the form follows the function. On the other hand, actual use is how the tool was used. This sometimes disregards the pot's form as long it can do a specific function.

Kalinga Pottery and its Uses

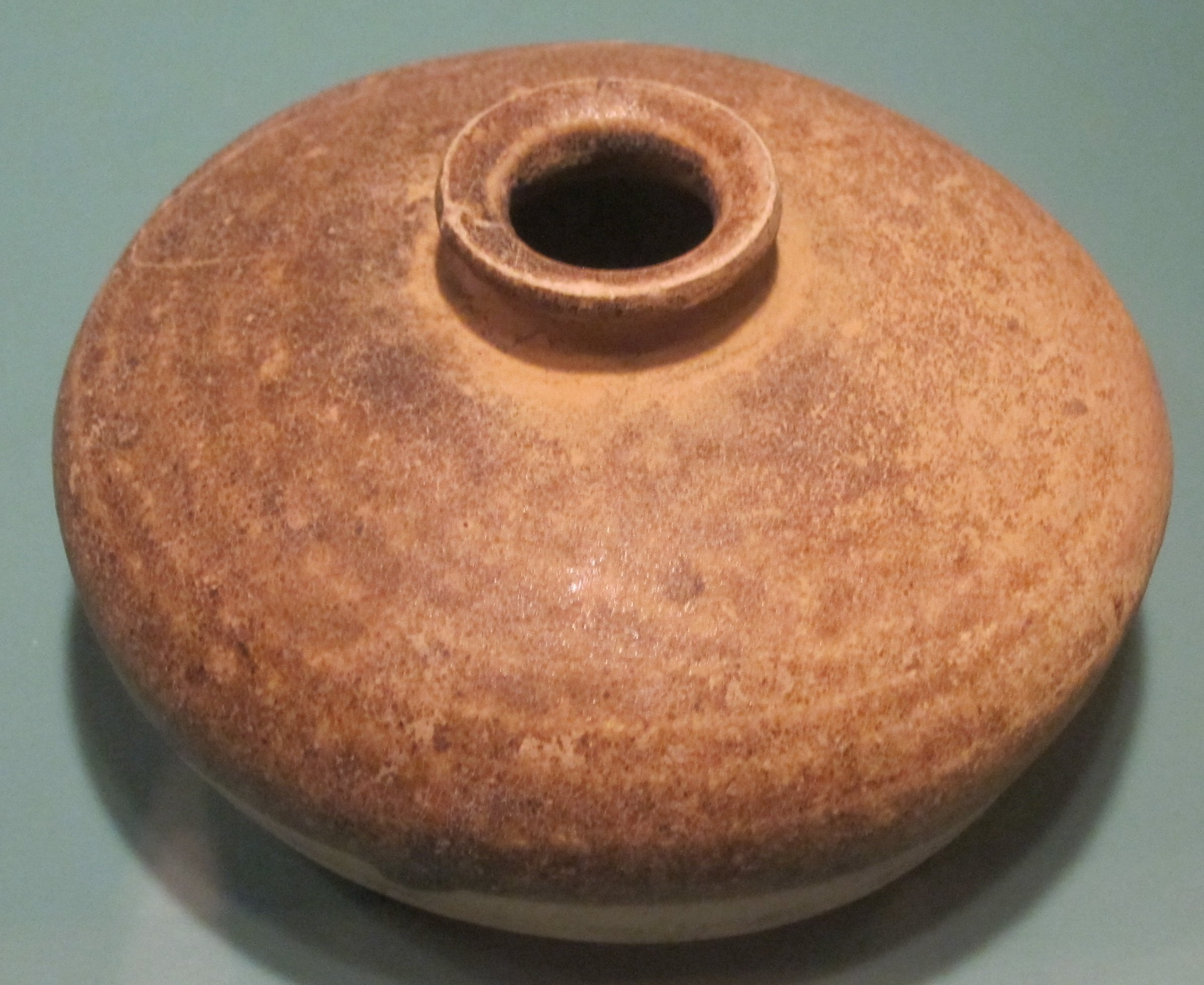
A jar from the Philippines housed at the Honolulu Museum of Art, dated from 100–1400 CE.

In Kalinga, ceramic vessels can be used for two situations: daily life use and ceremonial use. Daily life uses include the making of rice from the pots and the transfer of water from nearby water bodies to their homes.

• Determining actual function of Kalinga pots

As said, a pottery sometimes has a different actual use than intended use. This is the reason why when archaeologists study the function of a pottery, they tend to focus on how the tool was actually used. They do this by studying the alterations that the pottery has. These alterations, accretion and attrition, are commonly the abrasions and scratches on the vessel. In Skibo's study of Kalinga potteries functions, he relied on three main tests, namely (1) dissolved residue, (2) surface attrition and (3) carbon deposition.

1. Dissolved residue – This test was done to determine the organic matters that were once placed in the vessel. Through the combination of a gas chromatograph and a mass spectrophotometer, the composition of the fatty acids inside the vessel was determined. Although a complete identification of the species of plant and animals was not possible, Skibo managed to know which pots were used for rice and vegetable/ meat cooking.
2. Surface Attrition – Skibo's study on the attrition of the pots showed how the pot was used. By looking at the trace attritions inside the vessel, the type, frequency, angle and direction of stirring for each pot was determined. Furthermore, Skibo also concluded that two pots can be differentiated from each other, on the basis of what type of food it cooks, from the abrasions. He said that rice pots will have a little amount of stirring while the vegetable/meat pots will have numerous marks.
3. Carbon Deposition – This test, as said by Skibo, can determine the type of food cooked, how it was cooked and how the pot was placed on the flame. From this, another distinction between rice and vegetable/meat pots was established.

Iron Age pottery

There are three major complexes in Philippine Iron Age according to Solheim, Kalanay, Novaliches and Bau pottery complexes. Kalanay pottery complex pertains to Beyer's Early Iron Age pottery of the Visayan Islands found in Negros and Mindoro; novaliches pottery complex to Beyer's Early Iron Age pottery from Rizal province. Bau pottery, on the other hand, does not fit into the two previous complexes and could correspond instead to the Late Iron Age pottery.

Kalanay Pottery Complex

The type site of the Kalanay pottery complex is the Kalanay Cave found in Masbate. From this site, the pottery is further subdivided into pottery types Kalanay and Bagupantao.

Specific varieties of decoration are as follows:

- Paired diagonals and borders, with variations including single diagonals or verticals and borders, or wavy lines and borders
- Curvilinear scrolls and triangles
- Rectangular scroll
- Triangles, with variations including alternating triangles and borders or running triangles
- Rectangles and diagonals
- Zoomorphs
- Punctate fieldwhere areas bonded by incised lines are emphasized by punctuations or dashes
- Diagonals without borders, including a band of horizontal V's and alternating diagonals off a center line
- Impressed crenelations
- Impressed or carved scallop design
- Impressed tool
- Carved cutouts in ring stands

Kalanay complex pottery can be divided into 16 groups according to Solheim.

1. Large jars with wide necks
2. Large jars with narrow necks
3. Small jars
4. Deep bowls
5. Shallow bowls
6. Very shallow bowls
7. Lids
8. Shallow bowls with ring stands
9. Tetrapods
10. Jars with angle between side and bottom
11. Spherical jars with small mouths, without angle at rim
12. Angular Vessels

Bau Pottery Complex

It has less variation in both form and decoration compared to the Kalanay pottery complex.

Specific varieties of decoration are as follows:

- Paddle Impressed
- Tool Impressed, including simple-tool and compound-tool impressed
- Stamp Impressed
- Applique ribbons of clay

In terms of forms:

- Small jars with everted rims
- Small jars without everted rim
- Small heavy jars with flat bottom
- Cups with ring feet
- Jars with ring feet

Novaliches Pottery Complex

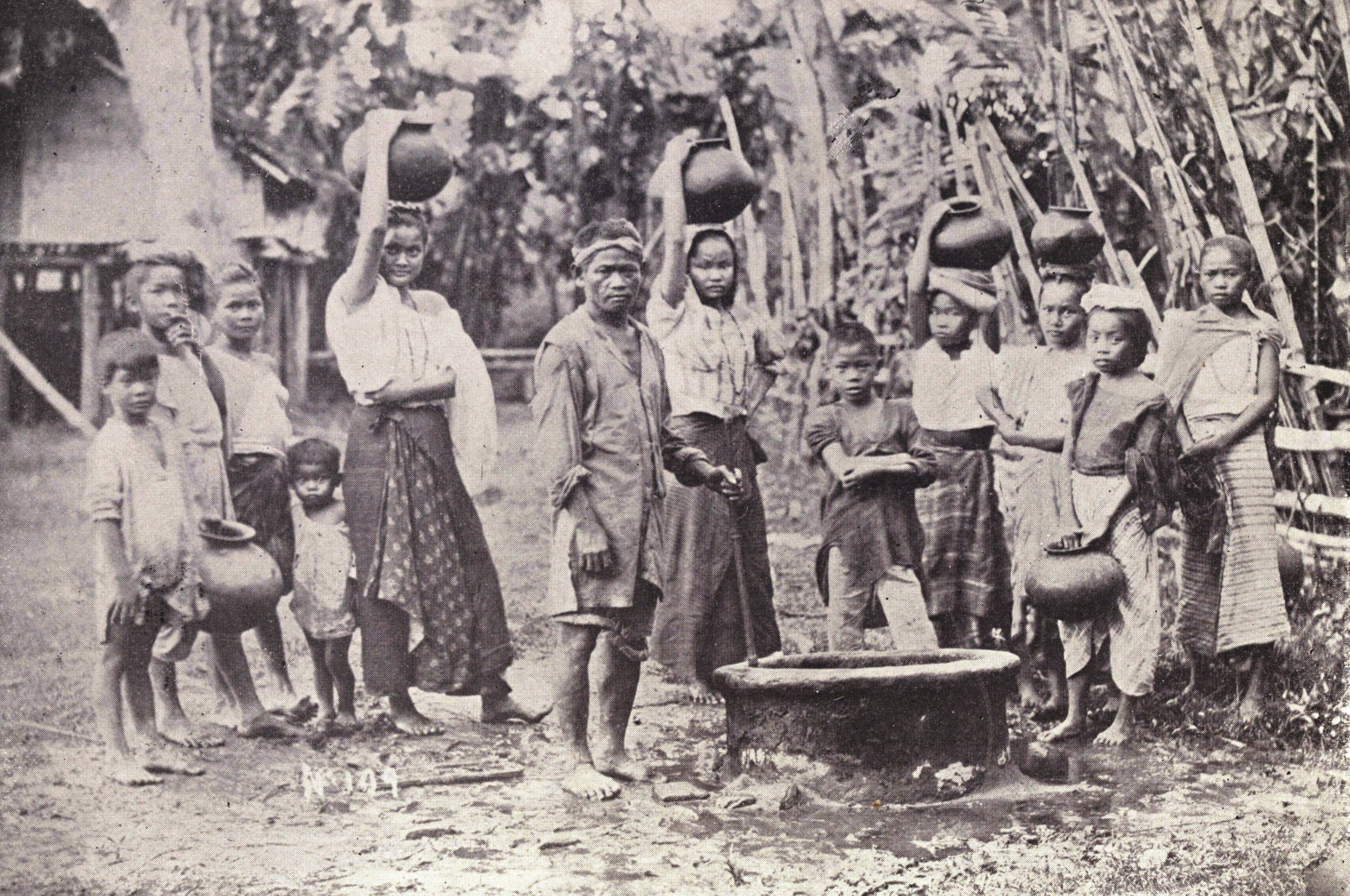
Carriers with water pots, in Iloilo (1899).

Most of Novaliches pottery can be distinguished from Bau pottery and Kalanay pottery. While it shares form and decoration with Kalanay pottery, it contains more variability compared to Bau pottery. According to Solheim (2002), “it is the most sophisticated pottery that has yet been found in the Philippines”

Novaliches pottery can be diagnosed by its form being a shallow bowl with a high right-foot. The shallow bowl is generally plain but the feet are highly decorated. Majority of Novaliches pottery were well polished. The form is so symmetrical that it looks as if it was made in a potter wheel, however, examinations showed that it wasn't.

Specific varieties of decoration are as follows:

- Cutouts
- Narrow vertical elements; carved, tool impressed, or running impressed lines
- Horizontal and diagonal elements, including simple tool impressions, compound tool impressions and carved elements
- Horizontal broadline impressed lines

Vessel forms are as follows:

- Shallow bowls with high ring stands
- Shallow bowls with low-ring stands
- Jars with low-ring stands
- Angle jars
- Jars with short necks and everted rims

Kalanay Cave Site

The Kalanay cave site is a small burial cave. It is located at the northwest coast of Masbate.

• Kalanay Pottery

- Kalanay Plain
- Majority (80 per cent) of the excavated vessels.
- Variations in size and shape
- Technique used in the manufacture: Paddle-and-anvil technique
- Differences in the base of the vessels (some have rounded bottom while some use a ring foot or a tetrapod for support).
- Large observable differences in color that is associated with the inability of the potter to control the fire, causing the uneven distribution of the heat.

• Kalanay Incised

- Incised around the neck, rim of a jar or the outside of a bowl in a band of repeating elements
- Little care was given so the jars appear poorly made despite its well thought out designs. This can be attributed to the possibility that the certain tradition of this pot was no longer significant to the manufacturer
- Kalanay-Impressed: simple tool and simple and compound tool
- Simple tool impressing found around the jar or bowl with a flange

• Kalanay slipped

- Forms: jars, large with wide mouth and everted rim, or small with everted rim; bowls, deep with inslanting sides, or very shallow which turned out lip
- Some were polished, some were not.

Bagupantao Pottery

• Bagupantao Plain

- Majority of the pots’ paste is red-brown in color, with gray or black as the minority. Its texture ranges from fine to medium and its thickness is usually 5–8 mm in length. The common forms of the pots are jars with wide to narrow mouths and its normally large (a body diameter of 24 to 35 cm).
- Difference between Kalanay Plain: Evenness of color and cleanness of clay

• Bagupantao Impressed

- The type of paste is the same as Bagupantao plain, red-brown in color. It is also highly decorated on its rim with circles, punctuations and crenellations.
- Larger (28 –31 cm body diameter) and thicker (9-14 thickness) than Bagupantao plain.

• Bagupantao Painted

- The paste used is the same as Bagupantao impressed and plain but it is covered with heavy red hematite slip inside and outside of the neck.
- Thinner (2–7 mm) and smaller than Bagupantao plain.

• Extraneous Pottery - Three vessels that did not belong to the Bagupantao and Kalanay style were also found.

First pot

- Similar clay used as the Bagupantao and Kalanay vessels. The color, red-brown, was also the same, inside and out.
- Ornamented with small crystals on the paste and black flakes on the surface.
- As thin (3–8 mm) as the Bagupantao painted vessel.

Second pot

- Same size and structure as the Bagupantao pots.
- Used a different paste (fibrous texture and contained mineral inclusions)
- Heavily polished and the surface color ranges from red-brown to light gray.
- As thick as the Bagupantao plain jars (5–12 mm).

Third pot

- The paste used is chocolate-brown in color and its texture is fine.
- It is very thick (15–20 mm) when compared to the other pots.
- Poorly made because of the uneven distribution of heat to the pot (pieces break longitudinally).

In Japan, pottery from Luzon became especially esteemed and was used in Japanese tea ceremony as shimamono.

== See also ==
- Palayok
- Tapayan
- Burmese ceramics
- Khmer ceramics
- Lao ceramics
- Thai ceramics
- Vietnamese ceramics
- Earthenware ceramics in the Philippines
