= Thai ceramics =

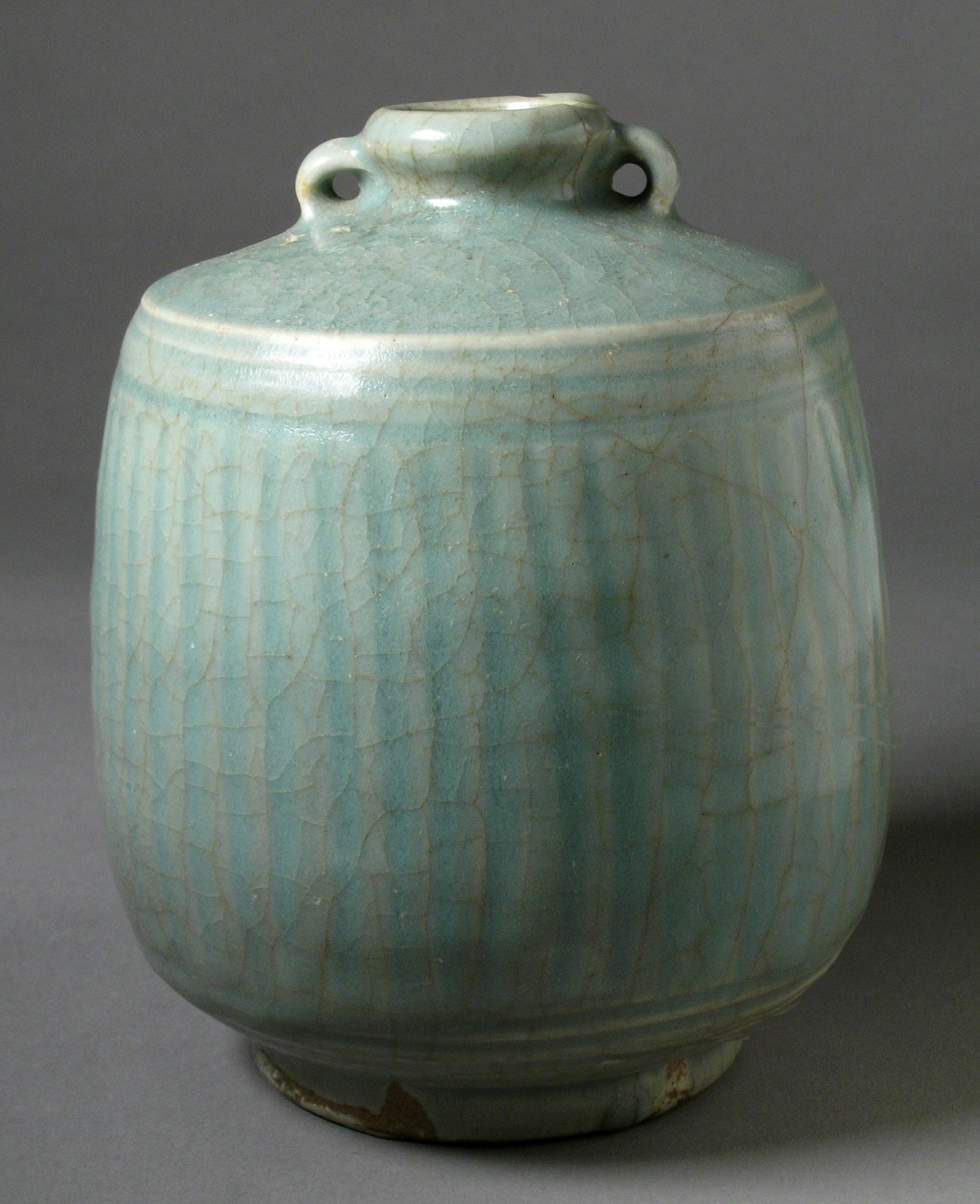
Bottle with two shoulder lugs and celadon glaze, 15th century

Thai ceramics are ceramic art and pottery designed or produced as a form of Thai art. The tradition of Thai ceramics dates back to the third millennium BCE. Much of Thai pottery and ceramics in the later centuries was influenced by Chinese ceramics, but has always remained distinct by mixing indigenous styles with preferences for unique shapes, colors and decorative motifs. Thai pottery and ceramics were an essential part of the trade between Thailand and its neighbors during feudalistic times, throughout many dynasties.

Thai ceramics show a continuous development through different clay types and methods of manufacturing since the prehistoric period and are one of the most common Thai art forms. The first type of Thai ceramics ever recorded was the Ban Chiang, dating back to about 3600 BCE. Sukhothai ware, the most famous style of Thai ceramics, is exported to many countries around the world today.

Medieval Thai wares were especially influenced by Chinese celadons, and later by blue and white porcelain.

== History ==
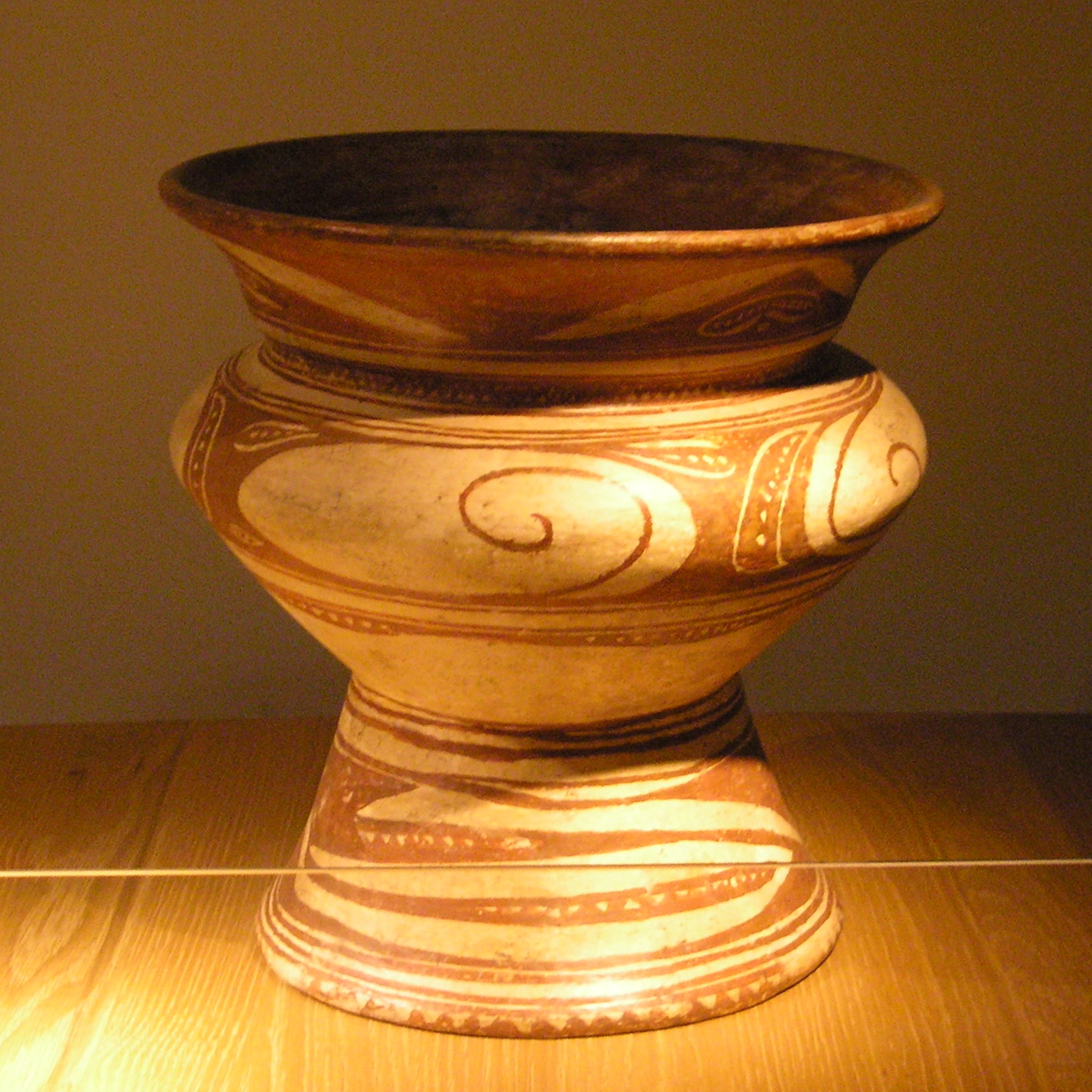
Painted ceramic bowl with base, Lopburi 2300 BCE. Bang Chiang culture.

The earliest trace of Thai ceramics ever recorded is the Ban Chiang, said to date back to about 3600 BCE and found in what is the present day Udon Thani Province, Thailand. The ceramics were earthenware. Common forms of excavated artifacts were cylinders and round vases. The early pots were undecorated while the later ones were carved with geometric patterns and swirling designs. Each of the pieces was also found to have axial perforations which showed that people at that time had knowledge of using tools.

The second important prehistoric Thai ceramics is the Ban Kao which was in Kanchanburi Province. Unlike Ban Chiang, Ban Kao's wares were thinner and had a glossy surface finish. What is interesting is that there are a wide range of forms and shapes, some of which are similar to bronze wares of Han China. After the prehistoric period the kingdom that emerged at about 1st century CE was the Mons. They made considerable ceramics uses in relation to religious symbols in the form of figurines. Ceramics were also used as a building decorations.

Following the Mons were the Khmers who appeared in about the 9th century CE Little is known about Khmer ceramics because archaeological research has focused on their great achievements in stone and bronze sculpture. The ceramics of Khmer era are quite interesting. Many of the designs include parts from animal and have a dark brown glaze finish.

The best known of all traditional Thai ceramics are those from Sukhothai and Sawankhalok. Sukhothai wares were generally treated with a creamy white slip and decorated in black with an opaque or greenish glaze. The most famous Sukhothai kiln is the Si Satchanalai. Examples of the wares can be found in many leading museums of the world. Sawankhalok products tend to be more finely made than the Sukhothai ones. These products are incised and often include animal shapes. Some of the original examples can be found in many private collections and museums today. Ceramics based on these styles are still made at present and widely exported, particularly to the Philippines and Indonesia.

=== Si Satchanalai ===
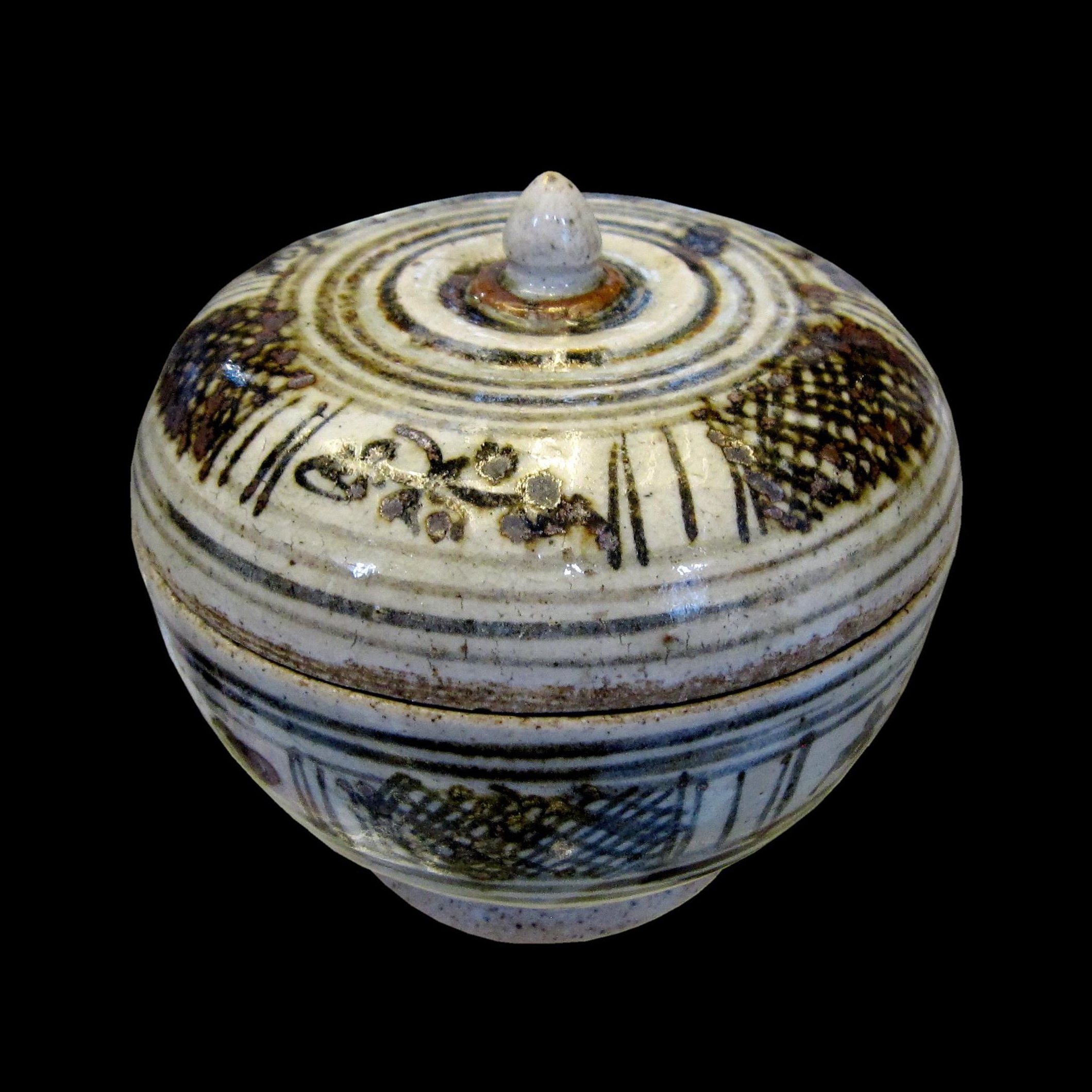
Box with a lid. Si Satchanalai, 13th-14th century

One of the most famous examples of Thai pottery are from the Sukhothai period from the kilns of S(r)i Satchanalai, which is around Sawankalok in north-central Thailand. This period started in the 13th century CE and continued until the 16th century. The art reached its apex in the 14th century. Examples of Si Satchanalai can be found in many leading museums of the world.

Sukothai traded with these precious ceramics with its neighbours. The transport was often by ship across the oceans. A number of Si Satchanalai ceramics in excellent condition have been excavated in ship wrecks in the Gulf of Thailand, the Andaman Sea and other waters.

== 18th century to present day ==
Bangkok, the capital of Thailand, was founded in 1782 and is represented by the Bencharong and Lai Nam Thong wares. It would seem that Bencharong ceramics first made their appearance during the final phases of the Ayutthaya period in the 18th century, while the Lai Nam Thong wares developed during the 19th century. Bencharong, meaning five colours in Thai, is a hand painted enamel over glazed ceramic. Bencharong was originally made in China and exclusively designed by Thai artists for Thai royals during the 18th – 19th centuries. Lai Nam Thong is an exclusive version of the Bencharong using gold embellishment instead of gold enamel. Both of these wares can be found in private collections of well-to-do citizens.

The Southeast Asian Ceramics Museum was opened in 2005 in Bangkok.

== Types ==
Name	Period	Notes	Example image
Ban Chiang	3400 BCE - 200 CE	spoons, beads, jars, vessel, pots, and vases. Some decorated with simple geometric patterns. Unglazed – red clay, some red on buff painted	Jar with spirals, burnished coil-built earthenware with incised decoration. Middle Ban Chiang culture, circa 1000-300 BCE
Ban Kao	2000 BCE – 500 BCE [5]	jars, vessel, pots, vase, and tripods. Decorated with simple geometric patterns. Ban Kao's ceramics are thinner when compared to Ban Chiang. Glazed – red and black clay	
Mon people	Hariphunchai, 200 CE – 1000 CE	figurines, votive tablets and building decorations. Unglazed – red clay	
Sukhothai ware	Sukhothai, 14th century – 16th century	animal figurines, bowls, and boxes. Opaque or greenish glazed – creamy white slip – fine clay	
Kalong ware	Sukhothai, 14th century – 16th century		Glazed stoneware dish from Thailand, Kalong ware, 15th century
Sankampaeng ware	Sukhothai, 14th century – 16th century		Glazed stoneware dish from Thailand, Sankampaeng ware, 15th century
Sawankhalok ware	Sukhothai, 14th century – 16th century	animal figurines, bowls, and boxes. Opaque or greenish glazed – creamy white slip – fine clay	
Si Satchanalai ware	Sukhothai, 14th century – 16th century	animal figurines, bowls, and boxes. Opaque or greenish glazed – creamy white slip – fine clay	
Ayutthaya	17th century - 18th century	bowls, pedestal plates, roof tiles, and votive tablets. Enameled painted – creamy white slip – fine clay	
Benjarong	Bangkok, 18th century - present	bowls, pedestal plates, roof tiles, and votive tablets. five colours, influenced from China	
Lai Nam Thong	Bangkok, 19th century - present		

== See also ==
- Thai art
- Burmese ceramics
- Chinese ceramics
- Lao ceramics
- Khmer ceramics
- Philippine ceramics
- Tapayan

== Literature ==
- Yip, C.H (1978). Thai ceramics through the ages. Hong Kong : The Hong kong Museum of History. p. 79. ISBN 962-215-008-X.
- Shaw, J.C. (1987). Introducing Thai ceramics also Burmese and Khmer. Thailand : Craftsman Press. p. 111. ISBN 974-7315-04-1.
- Thai ceramics: Ban Chiang, Khmer, Sukothai, Sawankhalok. Art Gallery of South Australia. 1977. p. 208. ISBN 978-0-7243-3456-8.
- Itoi, Kenji (1989). Thai Ceramics from the Sosai Collection. Oxford University Press. p. 136. ISBN 978-0-19-588918-5.
- Shaw, J.C. (1989). Northern Thai Ceramics. Duangphorn Kemasingki. p. 136. ISBN 978-974-7315-17-2.
- Shaw, John (1990). Northern Thai Ceramics (in Thai). Bangkok: Cultural Arts Center. p. 111.
- Lau, Aileen (2004). Thai Ceramic Art. Sun Tree Publishing. p. 320. ISBN 978-981-05-0736-7.
- Labbé, Armand J. (2007). Prehistoric Thai Ceramics: Ban Chiang in Regional Cultural Perspective. White Lotus. p. 155. ISBN 978-974-480-020-6.
- Brown, Roxanna Maude (2009). Ming Gap and Shipwreck Ceramics in Southeast Asia: Towards a Chronology of Thai Trade Ware. River Books Press Dist A C. p. 206. ISBN 978-974-9863-77-0.
