= Lao ceramics =

Lao ceramics refers to ceramic art and pottery designed or produced as a form of Lao art. The tradition of Lao ceramics dates back to the third millennium BCE. Pottery and ceramics were an essential part of the trade between Laos and its neighbours.

== History ==
Ceramics were first uncovered in 1970 at a construction site at kilometer 3, Thadeua Road in the Vientiane area of the Mekong Valley. Construction was halted only temporarily, and the kiln was hastily and unprofessionally excavated over a one-month period. At least four more kilns have been identified since then, and surface evidence and topography indicate at least one hundred more in the Ban Tao Hai (Village of the Jar Kilns) vicinity. Archaeologists have labeled the area Sisattanak Kiln Site.

According to Honda and Shimozu (The Beauty of Fired Clay: Ceramics from Burma, Cambodia, Laos, and Thailand, 1997), the Lao kilns are similar to the Siamese types found at Suphanburi and Si Satchanalai. But Hein, Barbetti and Sayavongkhamdy (An Excavation at the Sisattanak Kiln Site, Vientiane, Lao P.D.R., 1989, 1992) say that the Lao kilns, which are of a cross-draft clay-slab type, differ substantially not only from the Siamese types but all other types in Southeast Asia.

Because only one kiln, VS8, has been excavated, almost no questions regarding Lao ceramic tradition have been answered. The VS8 kiln though showed no evidence of brick construction. It had square chimney foundations, a narrow firebox, and was built partly above ground.

The Sisattanak Kiln Site lies just outside Vientiane's first city walls, which are dated to the 15th century. Radiocarbon dating of the kiln gives a 15th-17th century timeframe, with an earlier period of that range most likely. This is supported by the evidence of surface finds, which suggest that area kilns at higher elevations show a greater ratio of glazed to unglazed wares. The theory is that the kilns were moved up over time and that more glazed wares were fired over time. This is supported by the ceramics uncovered at VS8, a lower-elevation site, which were all of a utilitarian and domestic nature. They included pipes, domestic wares and architectural fittings.

The VS8 excavation uncovered both unglazed and glazed wares. Most of the glazed wares were pipes; 1,500 pipe fragments and complete pieces were collected. Their quality indicates a well-developed tradition, and their motifs suggest the possibility that they were export wares.

From the examples collected to date, it can be said that Lao ceramics used one kind of clay, with 5% quartz added as a temper. Both the clay and the quartz were finely crushed. The glazed wares were a light, translucent green (like celadon) or various shades of brown. There have also been shards showing an olive-colored glaze, not unlike the type found in Thailand.

Many of the glazed wares have ribbed or fluted exteriors, similar to that of the silver bowls ubiquitous in Laos, both the regular silver bowls ("oh tum") and the silver stem bowls ("khan"). Glazed ceramic stem bowls have been collected as surface finds at the Sisattanak Kiln Site. Decorations to glazed wares show a great measure of restraint, with simple incisions, stamps and fluting. Unglazed wares are similarly austere. They are generally not decorated with incisions or stamps, which are common in other Southeast Asian wares.

The VS8 excavation in 1989 added to an ever-increasing body of evidence that Lao ceramic tradition is significant. Future excavations are expected to prove that Lao ceramic production was comparable to that of other countries in the region.

== See also ==
- Burmese ceramics
- Khmer ceramics
- Thai ceramics
- Vietnamese ceramics
