= Khmer ceramics =

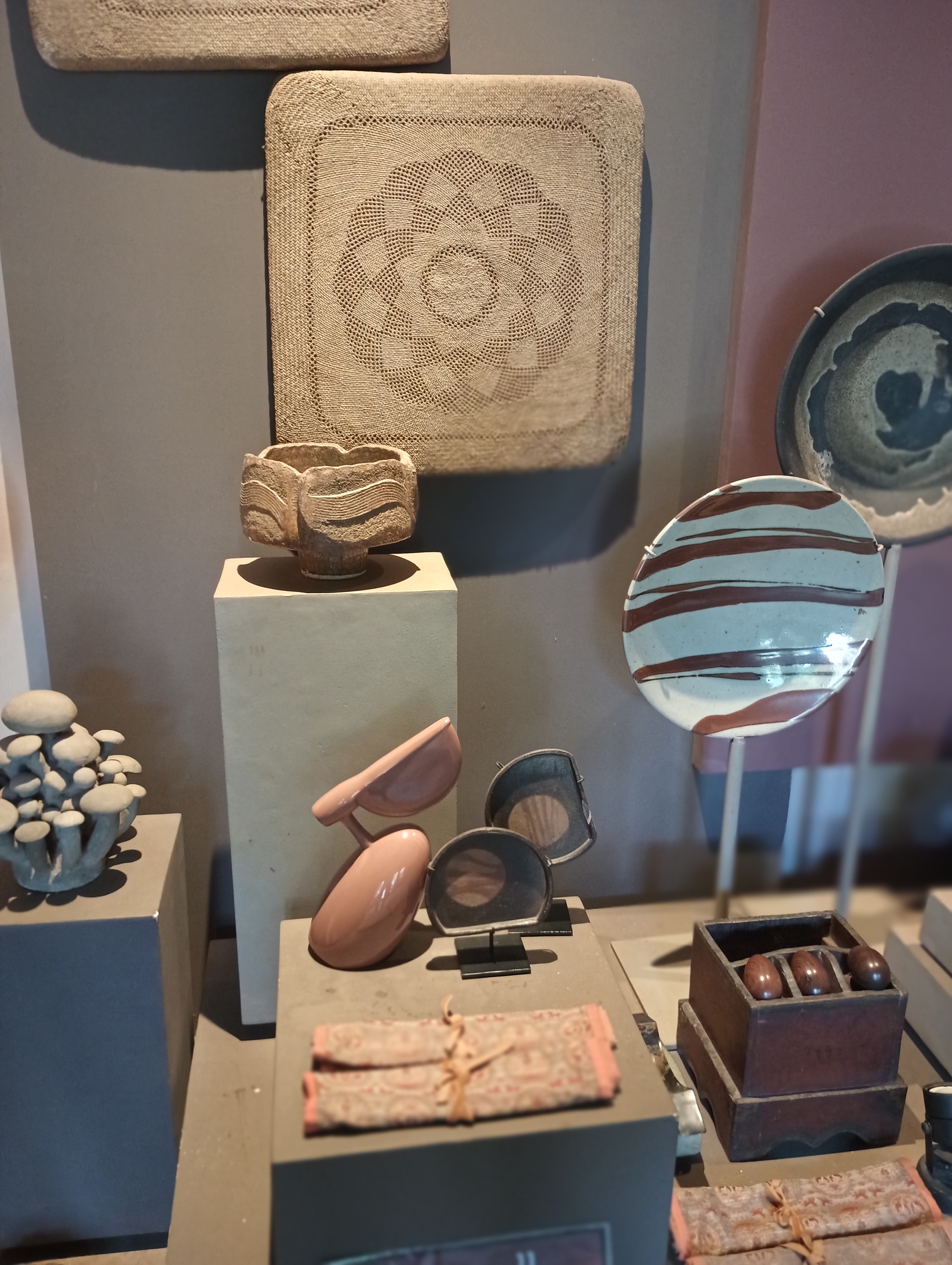
Modern Khmer ceramics on display.

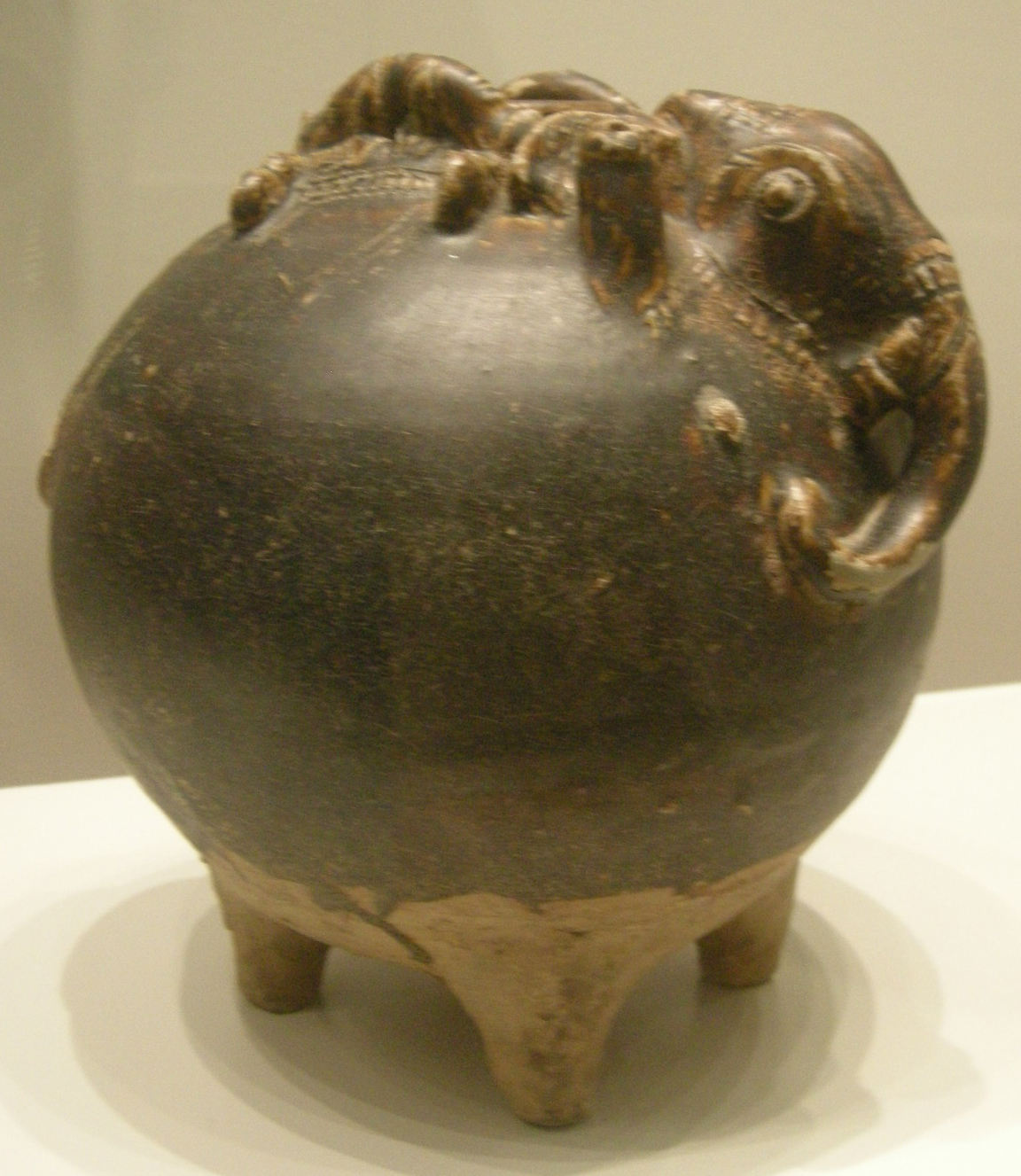
Elephant-shaped jar, turn of the 11-12th century

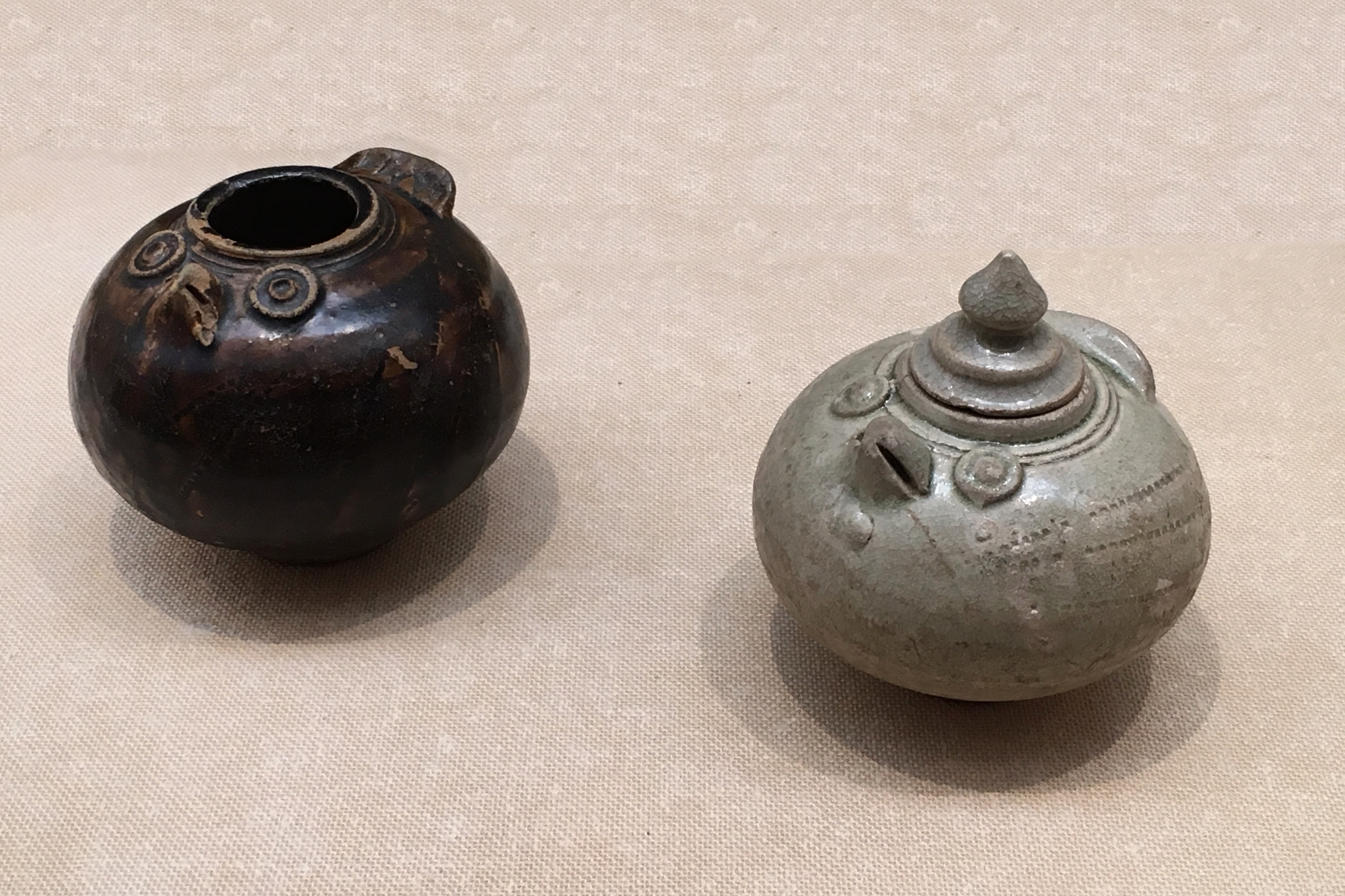
Bird-shaped small jars, 11-13th century

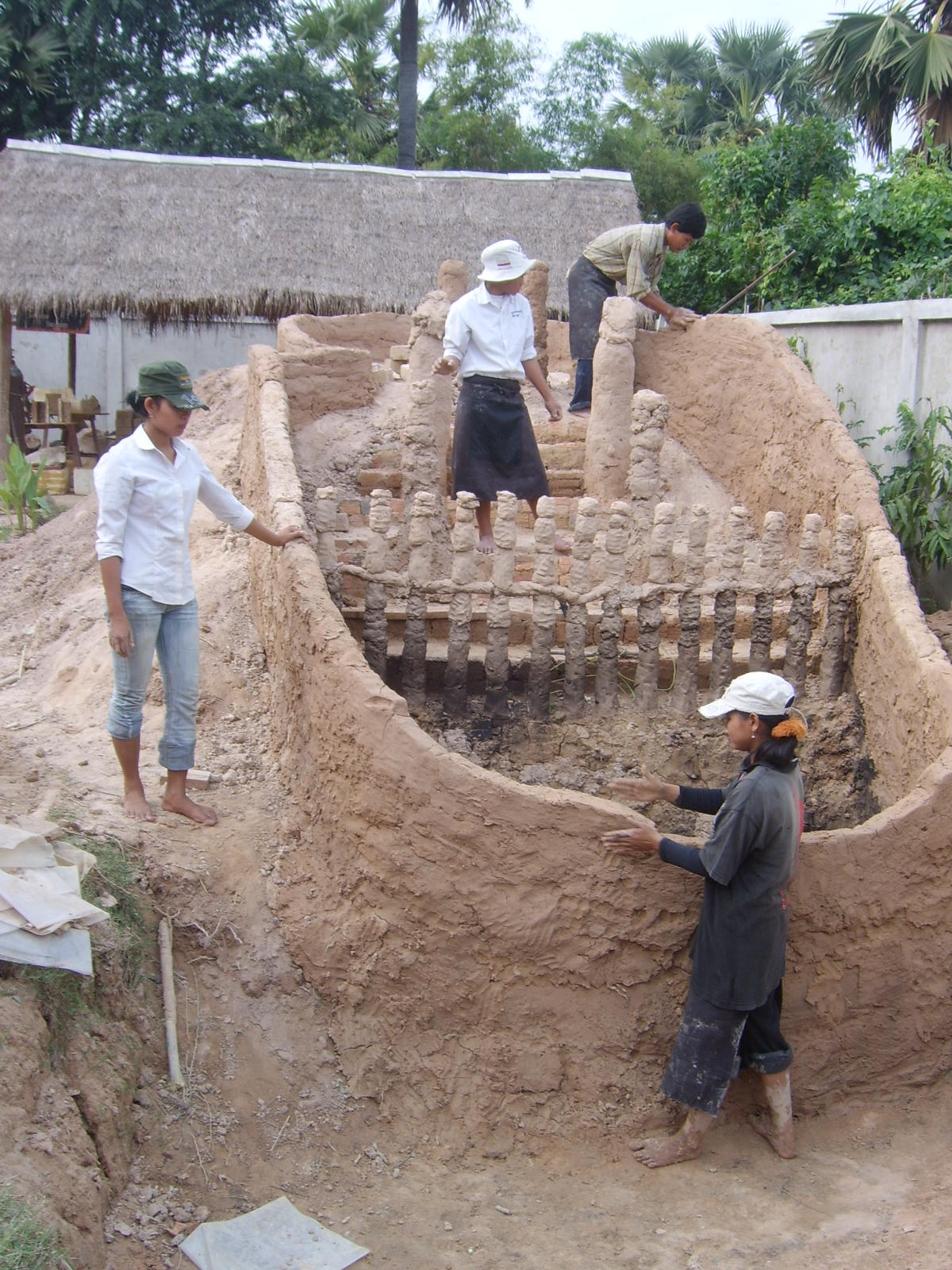
The construction of a kiln at the Khmer Ceramics & Fine Arts Centre

Khmer ceramics refers to ceramic art and pottery designed or produced as a form of Khmer art. The tradition of Cambodian ceramics dates back to the third millennium BCE. Pottery and ceramics were an essential part of the trade between Cambodia and its neighbours.

In Europe the Musée Guimet in Paris has a number of historic Cambodian ceramic pieces.

The Khmer Ceramics & Fine Arts Centre in Siem Reap was established in 2006 to re-establish ancient pottery techniques and production. The National Museum of Cambodia houses an important collection.

== See also ==
- Burmese ceramics
- Lao ceramics
- Philippine ceramics
- Thai ceramics
- Vietnamese ceramics
