= Khmer Ceramics & Fine Arts Centre =

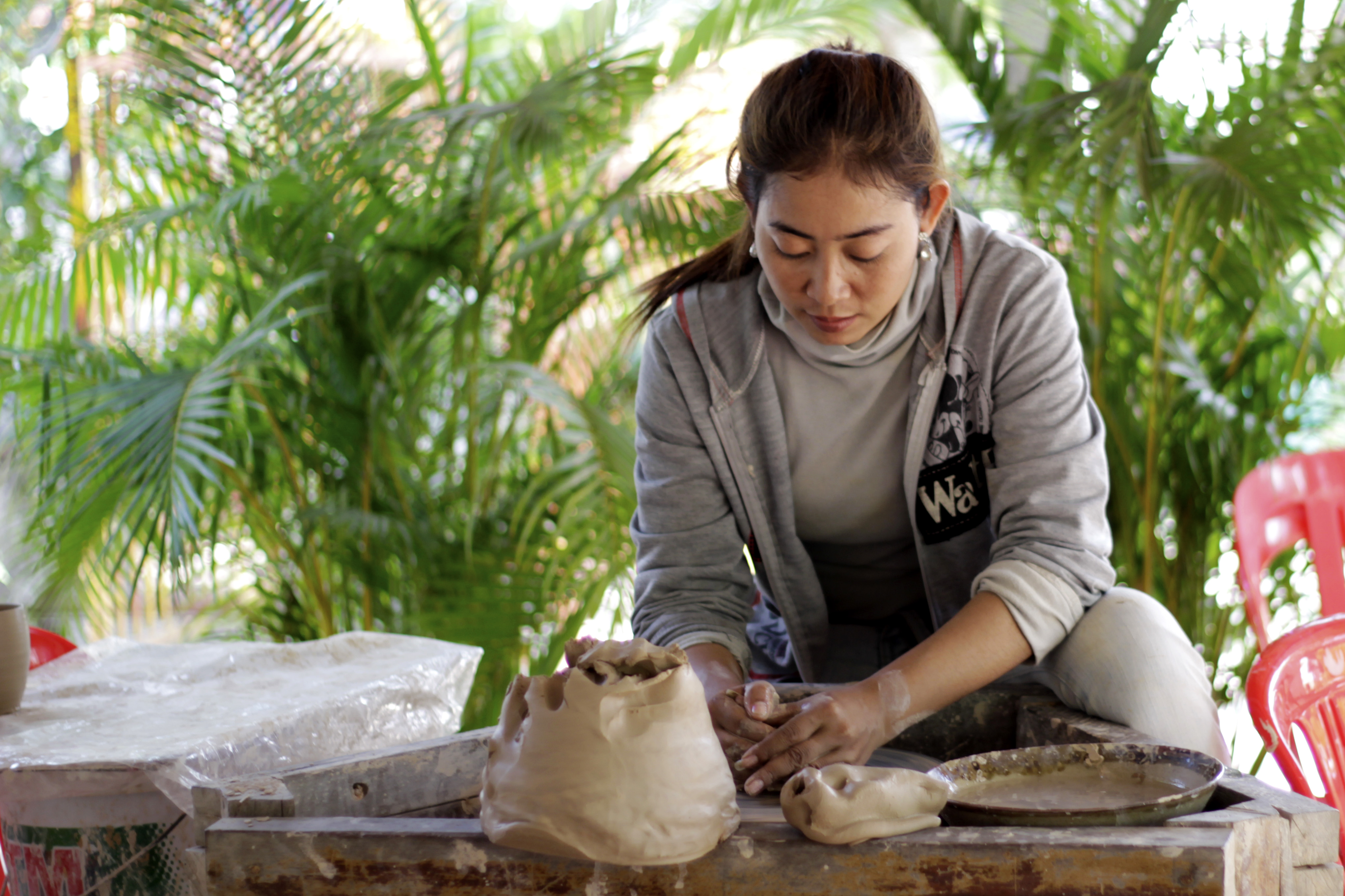
Potter making a bowl on a traditional potter's wheel

The Khmer Ceramics & Fine Arts Centre, formerly known as the National Centre for Khmer Ceramics Revival (NCKCR), is an organization aiming to rediscover and reintroduce Khmer ancestral pottery techniques and support the development of contemporary Khmer ceramics art. In the process, the centre creates economic opportunities, helping to decrease poverty in Cambodia. It is located in Siem Reap.

== History ==
=== 2006 ===
- Khmer Ceramics & Fine Art Centre first begin with the name of : NCKCR (National Centre for Khmer Ceramics Revival).

=== 2007 ===
- Reconstitution of a Cambodian traditional wood kiln 40 000 Litres. This kiln has mobilized 15 people for two months + 5000h work. The original kiln has been discovered at Phnom Kulen.
- 1st International Khmer Ceramics festival & Conference. The conference is held at the CKS center for Khmer study.

=== 2009 ===
- November 2009 the NCKCR (National Centre for Khmer Ceramics) is relocated on the Temple Road.
- December 2009 the NCKCR is renaming ‘’Khmer Ceramics’’.

=== 2011 ===
- Khmer Ceramics is renaming ‘’Khmer Ceramics & Fine Arts Centre’’.

=== 2013 ===
- The 1st retail shop is open in the heart of Siem Reap ‘’Alley west street’’.

=== 2014 ===
- The center delocalized the Production Site & Kiln Site to Tramniak to expand the activity center located on the Temples Road.
- The center offers a new activity that involves painting on pottery bisque.

== Research & Ancient kiln ==
=== Ancient Cambodian glaze ===
Research on Khmer Antique glazing and techniques - Antique Khmer ceramics are renowned, but the technology was lost during the recent terrible upheavals in Cambodia (Khmer Rouge). The center has sought to rediscover this technology, researching antique Khmer glazing, bisque, kilns, potters language etc.

=== Ancient Cambodian Kiln reconstitution ===
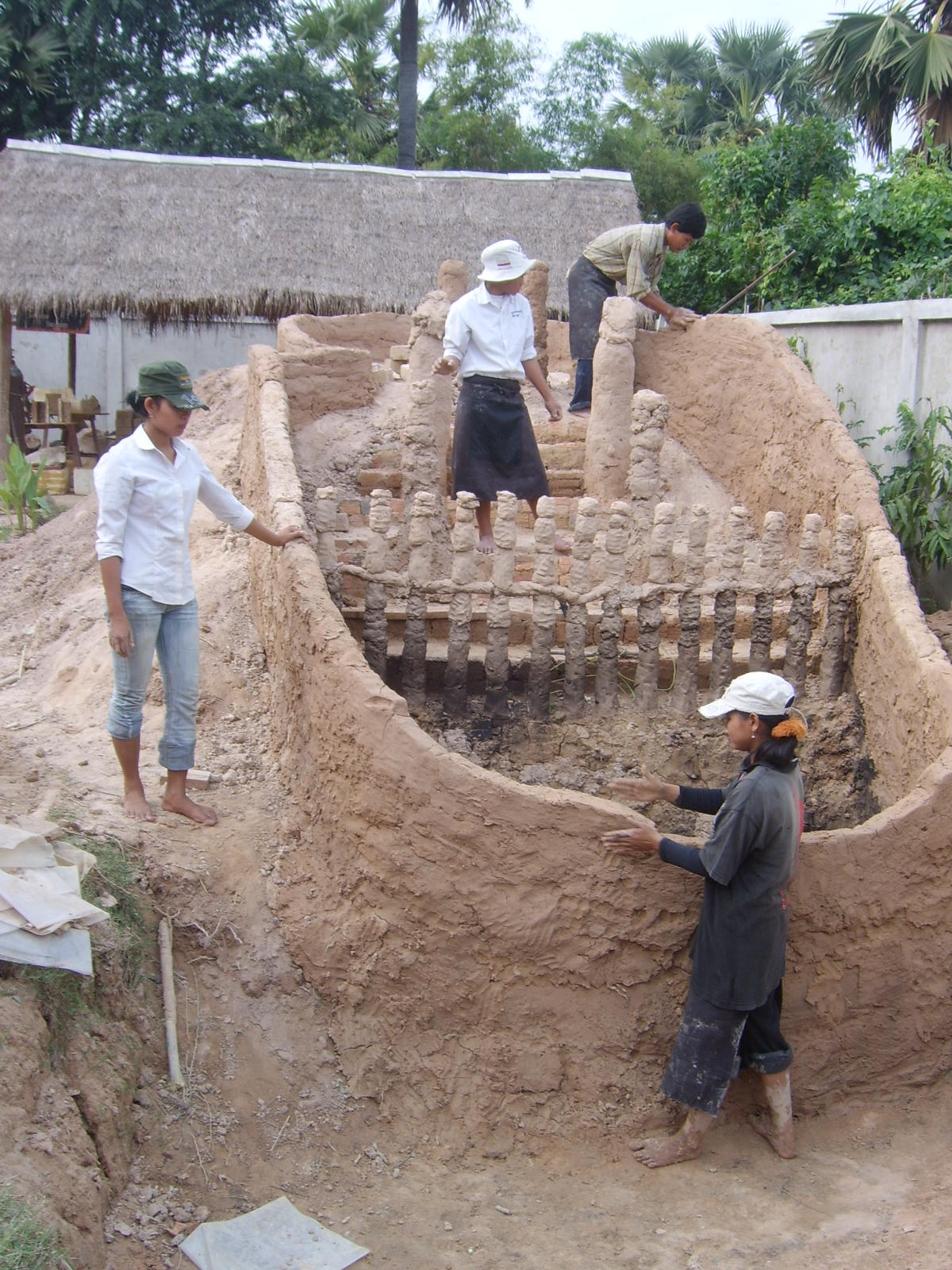
During the reconstitution of a traditional Cambodian kiln at Khmer Ceramics & fine arts centre in Siem Reap Cambodia

In September 2007 the centre start the construction of an antique Khmer kiln (dragon kiln). The first firing as being done in December 2007 the first time in 500 years such kiln as being fired in Cambodia - a 10 day and night event. This kiln is the reconstitution of one of the largest wood kiln of the Khmer Empire 40,000 Litres (discovered at Phnom Kulen). It also allows to fire reconstituted antique Khmer glaze under the same conditions that it was made in Angkor. Such a kiln is a major tool in the research of antique Khmer techniques.

Mr.Chhay Rachna (Conservation of Monuments in the Angkor Park and Preventive Archaeology, Cambodian government, APSARA Authority) held to assist the reconstitution. Mr.Chhay Rachna also participate with the ceramic production development to publish a poster ’’a guide to understanding Khmer stoneware characteristics from the late 9th to early 13th
