= Lao art =

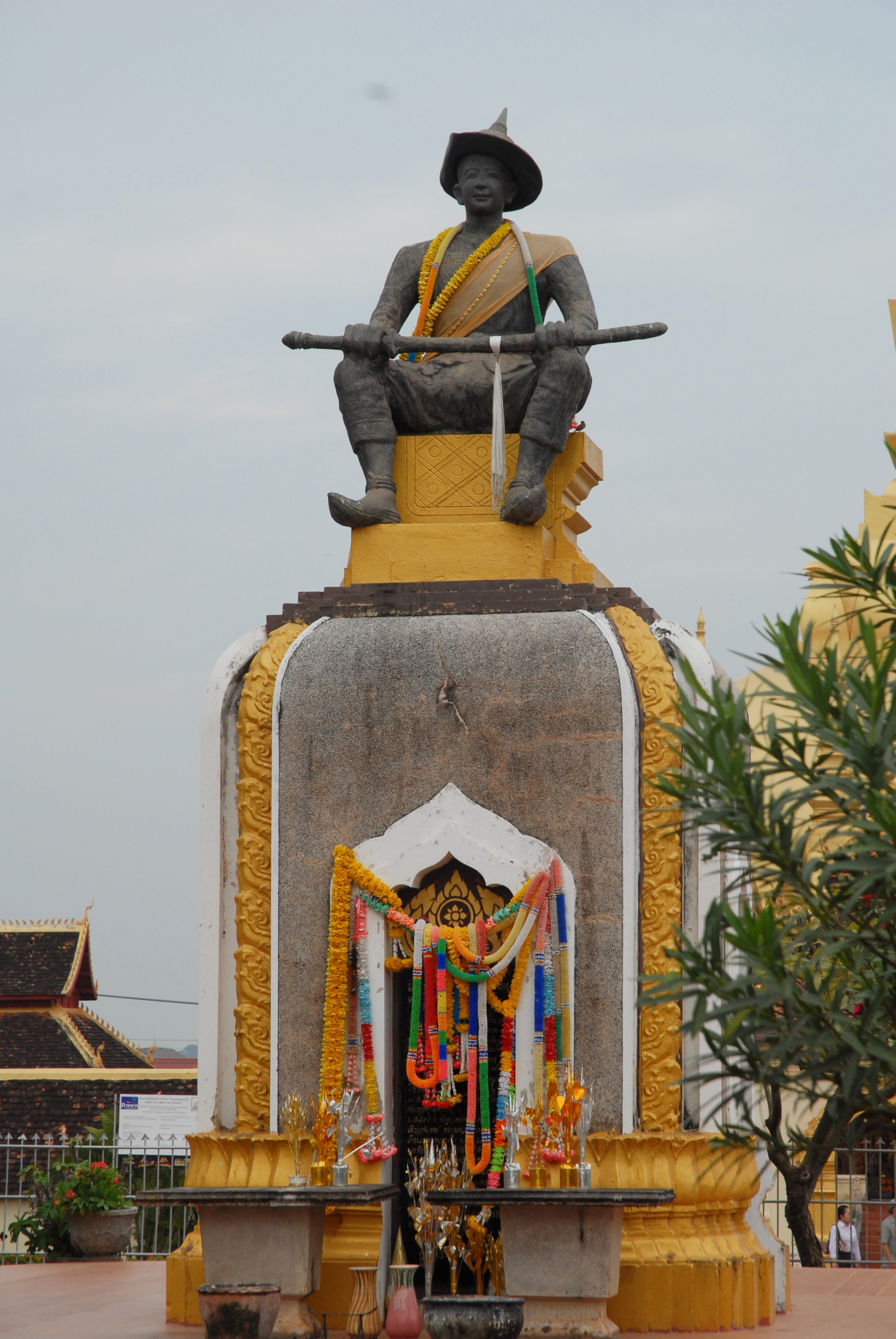
Monument to King Setthathirat

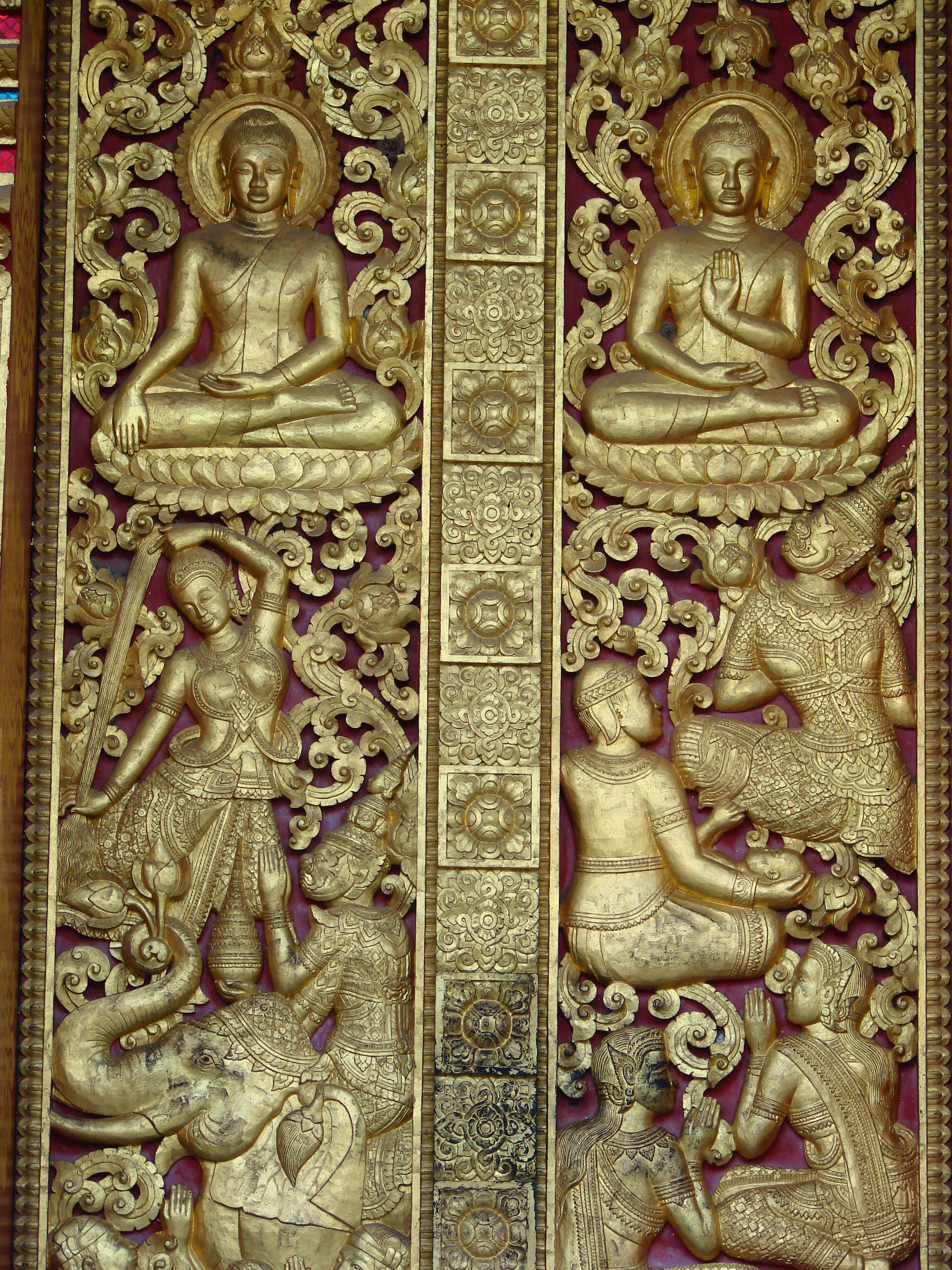
Reliefs at the Wat Pa Phai monastery

Lao art involves the myriad of forms creative, cultural expression originating from Laos. This includes both ancient artifacts and recent productions. Laotian Art often features Buddhist themes and includes such material forms as textiles, wood-carving and basket-weaving. Lao art is well known for its wealth of ornamentation

== Ceramics ==
Lao ceramics were first uncovered in 1970 at a construction site at kilometer 3, Thadeua Road in the Vientiane area, Mekong Valley, Laos. Construction was halted only temporarily, and the kiln was hastily and unprofessionally excavated over a one-month period. At least four more kilns have been identified since then, and surface evidence and topography indicate at least one hundred more in the Ban Tao Hai Village of the Jar Kilns vicinity Archaeologists have labeled the area Sisattanak Kiln Site

=== Further research ===
- The work was carried out by a team of Laotian archaeologists and Australian archaeologists.
- A large number of ceramics (sherds, debris, and intact pieces) have been found there, some decorative objects, and molded pipes.
- The scientific tests done at the geographical location of the oven outside the first compound of Vientiane suggest that this site would date from the fifteenth century.
- The uncovered objects were grouped into four kinds: raw sandstone, glazed sandstone (bowls, dishes, jars, oil lamps, vases, weights for fishing net, chess pieces), molded pipes, and kendi pottery (utensils, stoves, and cooking pots).
- Sisattanak's pottery remains what archaeologists consider to be "simple", utilitarian, showing a lack of creativity on the part of the potters which would be the result of weak influences, or external competition.

Source: Don Hein: Mike Barbetti and Thongsa Sayavongkhamdy. An Excavation at the Sisattanak Kiln Site By: François Lagirarde

== Textiles ==
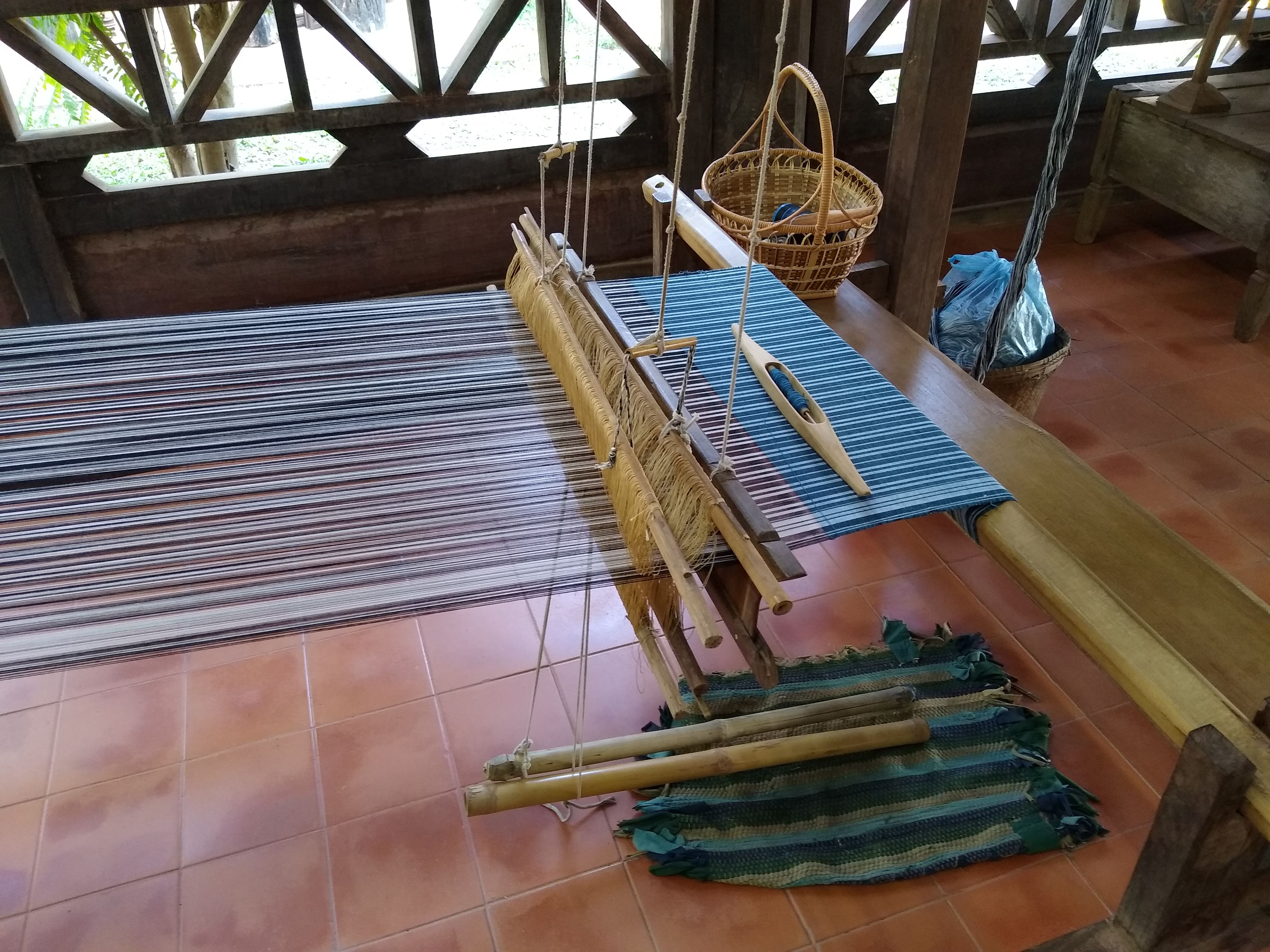
A loom at the Lao Textile Museum in Vientiane

The production of woven and embroidered textiles is the most prolific of all traditional crafts in Laos. Almost all regions of the country are suitable for the farming of cotton and mulberry trees, which are often planted on cooperative land with a view to providing raw materials for the wider community. Textiles are made of perishable materials and only survive the millennia when preserved under exceptional circumstances. Archaeological finds point to a high level of skill and sophistication at an astoundingly early date. The first prestigious garments were probably the skins of dangerous animals worn by daring hunters. In tropical regions, the alternative to leather was the inner bark of certain trees, which was beaten until it became soft. Succeeding generations developed more flexible fibres, with the invention of spinning which was used in different parts of the world to make yarn from wool, linen, cotton, or silk. Colour is very essential to textiles. In Laos, many villages, however, produce organic dyes from plants, roots, insect, resin, and soil. Raw dye materials are crushed or sliced and then boiled to extract the colour. The sediment is removed and the remaining liquid is suitable as a dye. Dyes are absorbed into the very fibres of textiles, ensuring a much longer lifetime than paints. Of the exceptional wealth of ornamentation, four groups of motifs have been distinguished:

1. Mythical Animals under the Water: Naga, a serpent; Louang, a serpent with legs and feet like a dragon; Eua, a serpent with no crest; Nark, a crested serpent.
2. Mythical Animals on Earth: Crab; Khon Khob, the frogman; Khon Thani, the gibbon person; Siho, the lion-elephant; Mom, the magical horse; Hong, the magical swan; Houng, the mythical eagle; Hadsadiling, the bird-elephant.
3. Plant Designs: tree, flower, vine, seed, fruit, leaf, and geometrical shapes like zigzag line, diamond, hook, and/or star.
4. Religious Motifs: Buddha head, Stupa, a temple shaped like a pyramid, and/or ancestors riding on mythological animals.

Source: Siho and Naga - Lao Textiles Reflecting a People's Tradition and Change By: Edeltraud Tagwerker

== Buddhist sculpture ==
Lao artisans have, throughout the past, used a variety of media in their sculptural creations. Of the metals, bronze is probably the most common, but gold and silver images also exist. Typically, the precious metals are used only for smaller objects, but some large images have been cast in gold, most notably the Phra Say of the sixteenth century, which the Siamese carried home as booty in the late eighteenth century. It is in enshrined at Wat Po Chai in Nongkhai, Thailand, just across the Mekong River from Vientiane. The Phra Say's two companion images, the Phra Seum and Phra Souk, are also in Thailand. One is in Bangkok and the other is in Lopburi. Perhaps the most famous sculpture in Laos, the Phra Bang, is also cast in gold, but the craftsmanship is held to be of Sinhalese, rather than Lao, origin. Tradition maintains that relics of the Buddha are contained in the image.
