= Burmese ceramics =

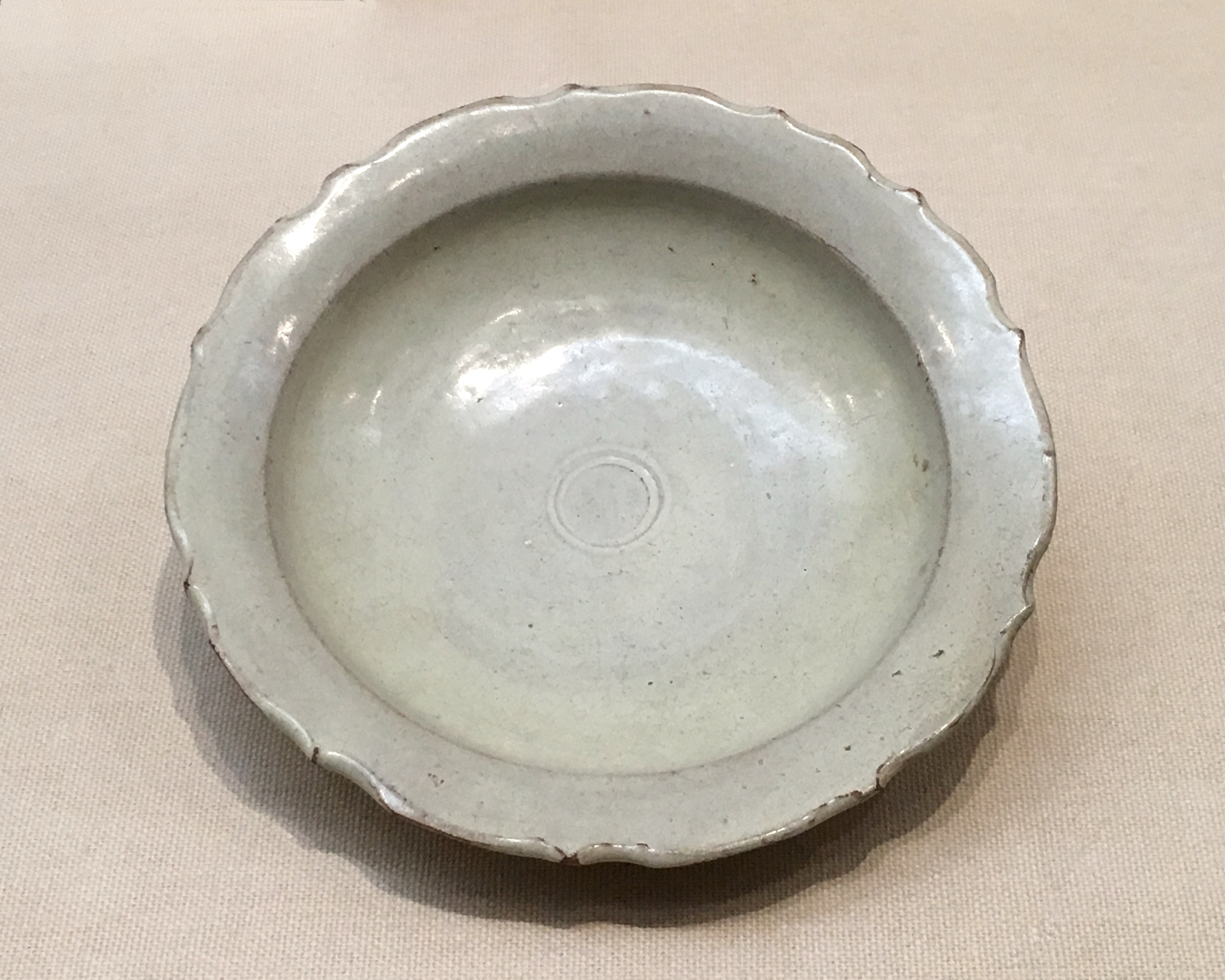
Foliated-dish, white glaze, 15-16th century

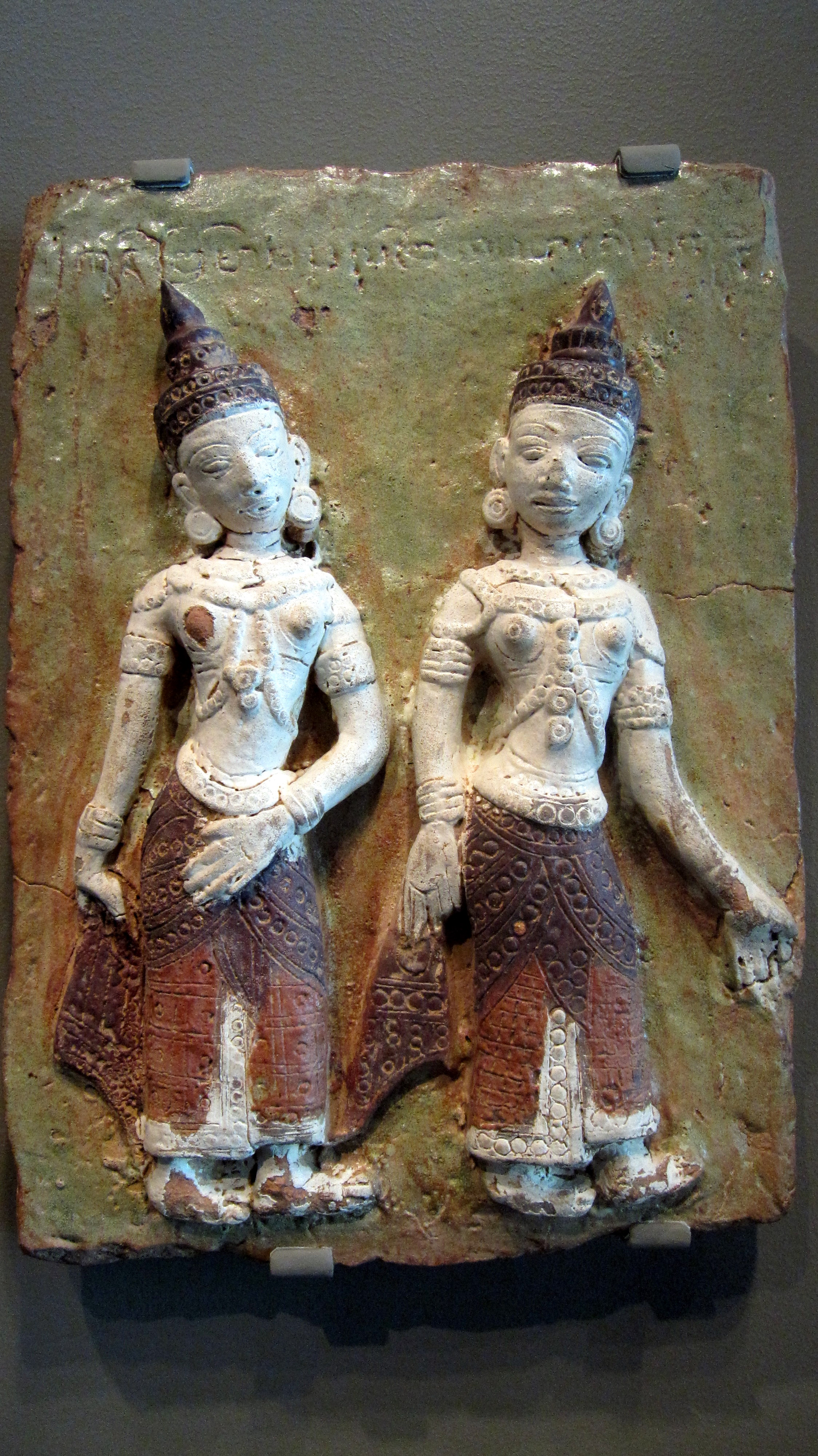
Daughters of the demon Mara, glazed terra cotta, 1460-1470, southern Myanmar

Burmese ceramics refers to ceramic art and pottery designed or produced as a form of Burmese art. The tradition of Burmese ceramics dates back to the third millennium BCE. Pottery and ceramics were an essential part of the trade between Myanmar and its neighbours.

The village of Kyaukmyaung (Sagaing) is an important traditional production centre.

== See also ==
- Khmer ceramics
- Lao ceramics
- Thai ceramics
- Vietnamese ceramics
