= Yokohama ware =

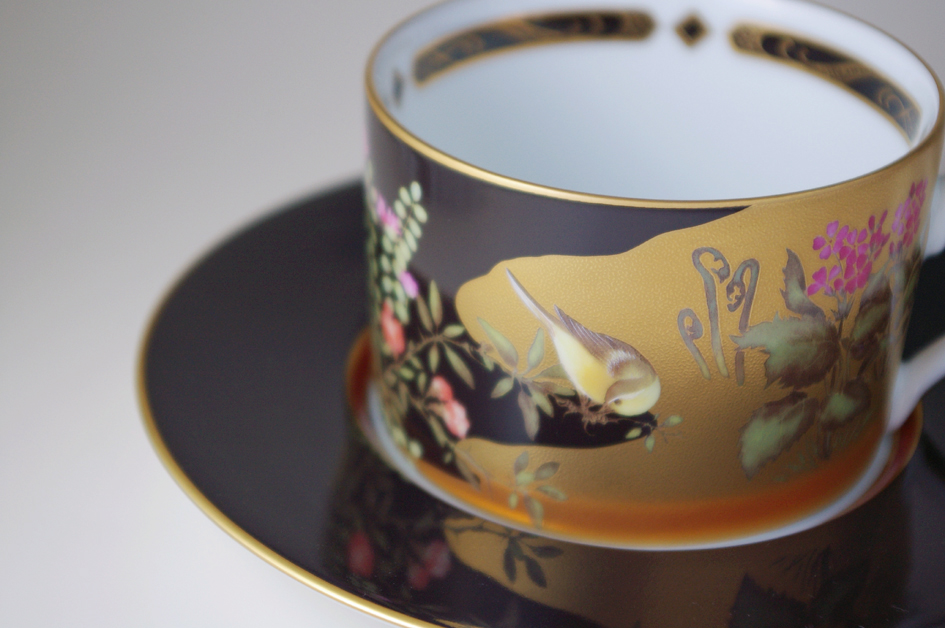
Yokohama porcelain coffee cup and saucer with river scene and birds in the Rinpa style, by Masuda Art

Yokohama ware (横浜焼, Yokohama-yaki) is a broad term for Japanese export porcelain mostly destined for export to Europe and the West, which was shipped out of Yokohama.

Yokohama ware is difficult to define, but encompasses styles such as Arita ware and Satsuma ware that were destined for export. One of the companies specialising in it is Masuda Arts.
