= Japanese export porcelain =

Japanese ceramics made for foreign trade

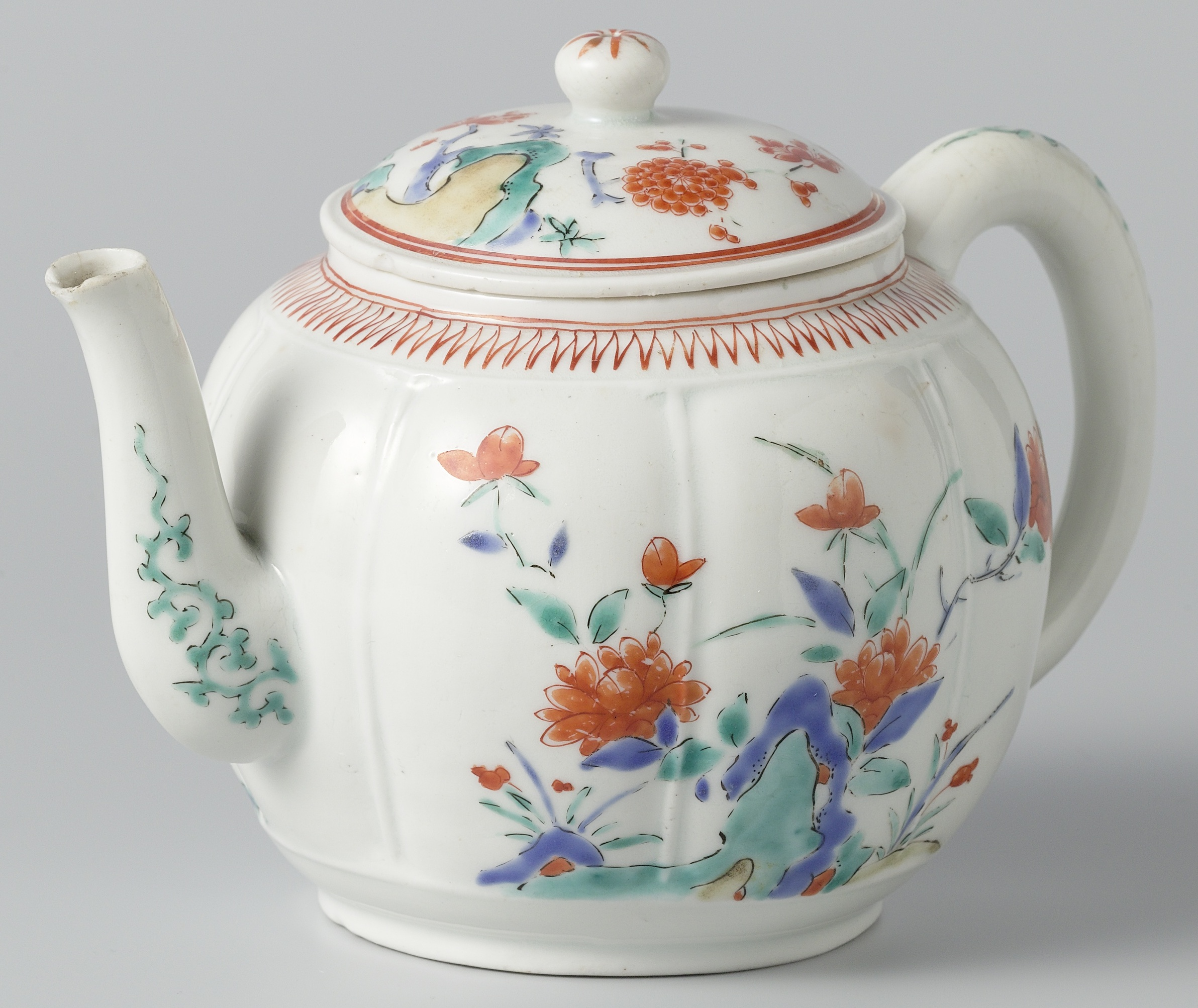
Kakiemon teapot, 1670–1690

Japanese export porcelain includes a wide range of porcelain that was made and decorated in Japan primarily for export to Europe and later to North America, with significant quantities going to south and southeastern Asian markets. Production for export to the West falls almost entirely into two periods, firstly between the 1650s and 1740s, and then the period from the 1850s onwards.

The wares produced are a complex and varying mixture of styles, based on Chinese porcelain, the local Japanese pottery and porcelain (itself much influenced by Korean porcelain), and European styles and tastes. Often the shapes were dictated by the export markets, but the decoration was predominantly East Asian in style, although quite often developed from Dutch imitations of Chinese pieces. In the first period the great majority of the wares were produced in the area of Arita, in the old Hizen Province and are covered by the terms Arita ware (or Hizen ware), Imari ware and Kakiemon, all of which have complications in their meanings in English.

Arita ware blue and white underglaze porcelain tankard with Dutch silver lid of 1690

In the later period, Satsuma ware was produced almost entirely for export, and factories began to brand their wares, with Noritake and Nikko Ceramics being well-known in the West.

== Early period ==
=== History of the trade ===
Chinese export porcelain made for European markets was a well-developed trade before Japanese production of porcelain even began, but the Japanese kilns were able to take a significant share of the market from the 1640s, when the wars of the transition between the Ming dynasty and the Qing dynasty disrupted production of the Jingdezhen porcelain that made up the bulk of production for Europe, and indeed were previously very popular in Japan itself.

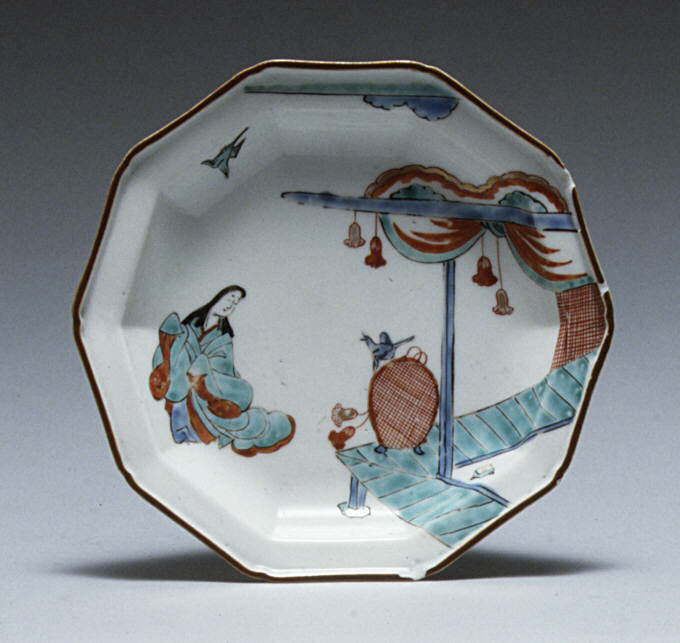
Plate with Japanese court woman and birds, Imari ware, 1710–1730

The Sakoku policy of the closure of Japan to foreigners, fully in place by 1639, allowed only the Dutch East India Company and the Chinese to ship exports from Japan, after 1641 both through tightly controlled trading posts at Nagasaki, the Dutch at Dejima. The Chinese then resold cargos to other Europeans in China. The Dutch began to buy on a small scale in the 1650s, by 1656 ordering 4,149 pieces. But in 1659 64,866 pieces were ordered, beginning the large scale trade that was to continue for nearly a century; in later years orders were often in six figures of pieces. For the rest of the century, the great bulk of Japanese porcelain was made for export. The Dutch also shipped to Japan the large quantities of cobalt required for the underglaze blue colour. As well as Europe, significant quantities were landed by the Dutch in India, Persia, and southeast Asia. This trade seems to have been preceded by exports of Arita celadon wares to south-east Asia, where most surviving examples appear.

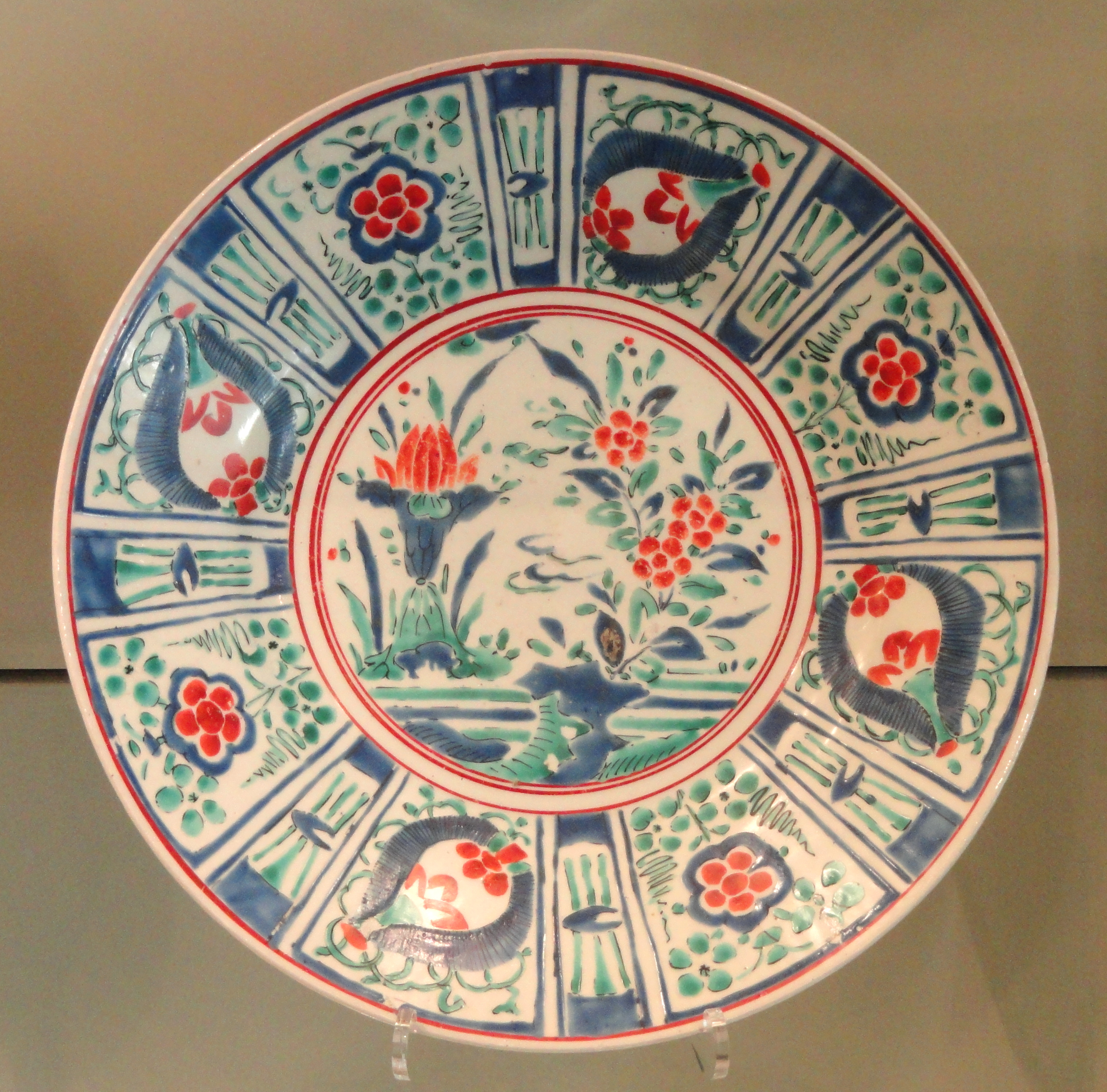
Large Export Dish, c. 1660–1670, Arita ware, hard-paste porcelain with overglaze enamels, the decoration drawing on Kraak ware Chinese export porcelain, though this is normally in blue and white

The huge order placed in 1659 overwhelmed the Arita kilns, and took two years to fulfill, with the help of other kilns, and the construction of many new larger ones in Arita, as archaeology has revealed. After a few years there seem to have been about twelve kilns around Arita making export wares, and only one or two producing for the domestic market.

The Dutch cargoes that reached Europe (rather than being sold on the way back, in India for example) were sold at auction in Amsterdam. The Chinese purchases of porcelain were sold in Chinese ports, largely to the other European trading companies. The wares reaching European countries differed considerably, probably because of the choices of the initial exporters. Kakiemon is much more common in old European collections outside Holland (England, France, and Germany), probably because the Chinese appreciated it. Top-quality "Kenjo-Imari" ware is found more in Germany than elsewhere.

Japanese porcelain generally fetched higher prices in Europe than the Chinese wares, and it was not until the 18th century that factories in Europe began to produce their own porcelain, so the trade was highly profitable for the Dutch and others bringing the goods into Europe, as well as the Japanese producers, who were less efficient than the Chinese, and charged more. But by the 1720s the Chinese wares became more attractive to Europe, in terms of both price and quality, and Japanese exports declined, almost ceasing by the 1740s, by which time European porcelain production was rapidly increasing. Trade had already reduced from the 1680s on, as the Dutch became occupied with wars in Europe, and the Chinese kilns once again reached full productivity.

=== Wares and styles ===
Generally the shapes followed European needs, following models provided by the Dutch; large flattish dishes also suited Middle Eastern and Southeast Asian dining requirements. The Dutch also supplied models for the Chinese styles of decoration they wanted, but apparently these were copied in wood from Chinese originals by Dutch carvers, explaining the crudeness of some Japanese efforts at Chinese imagery. The importation of foreign pottery was forbidden by the Japanese government in 1668, though some later pieces seem to have reached Japan; before that Japanese lords had requested examples of Delftware. One form of export ware rarely produced in Japan, unlike China, was armorial ware, at least partly because of the difficulty during Japan's "seclusion" of getting the designs from Europe to the Japanese decorators. There were some exceptions around 1700.

In blue and white wares, initially, the somewhat crude style of Chinese export porcelain known as Kraak ware was imitated for "open" shapes like plates and dishes. This seems to have been originally designed by the Chinese for Islamic southeast Asian markets, but became popular with Europeans. "Closed" shapes such as vases and bottles imitated Chinese "transitional wares", which had been much exported to Japan from the 1620s on; Japanese wares in the style date mostly from 1660–1680. These were freely painted with scenes in underglaze blue.

Arita wares with overglaze decoration ("enamels") in a wider range of colours are traditionally called Imari ware as a broad group, although they were often made in the same kilns around Arita as underglaze blue wares. Imari was merely the local port from where they were shipped to the Dutch and Chinese at Nagasaki, and not itself a centre for production. A large group is decorated in underglaze blue, to which overglaze red and gold, with black for outlines, and sometimes other colours, is added. The colouring is rich, and tends to cover most of the plate, with many plant-based designs. This contrasts with the Kakiemon style, with a very pure white body and sparse but very bright overglaze decoration in a broadly Chinese style, of birds and animals, figure scenes, and plant-based decoration. Some Imari wares also dropped the underglaze blue.

The last of the major groups is Ko-Kutani ware, a complex collection of wares mainly defined by their palettes of overglaze colours, and a generally rather dark tone, as well as a tendency to reflect traditional Japanese rather than Chinese influences in their decoration. Despite Kutani being a place, few if any seem to have been made there, and many were certainly made around Arita.

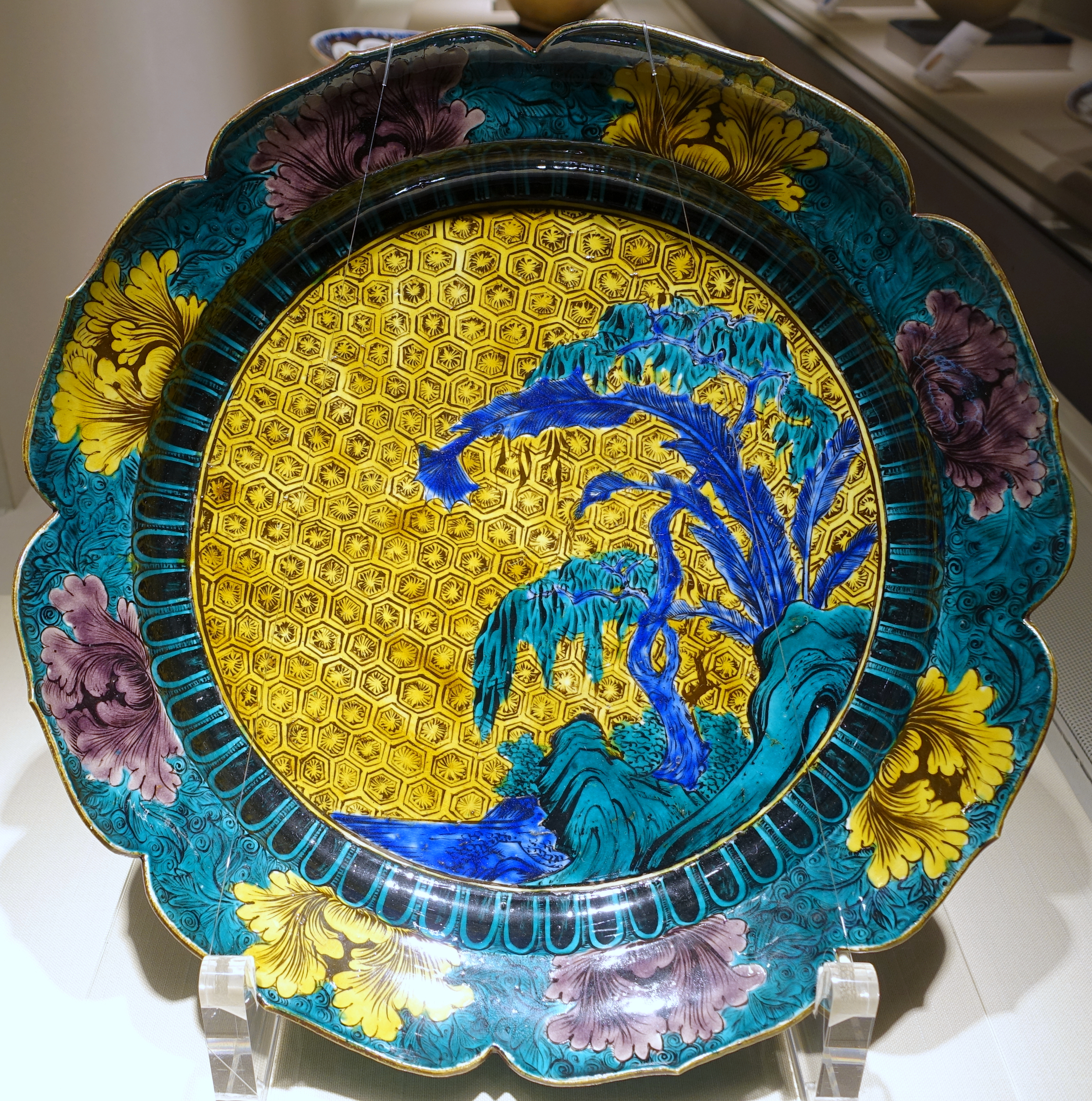
Ko-Kutani style, 1650s or 1660s

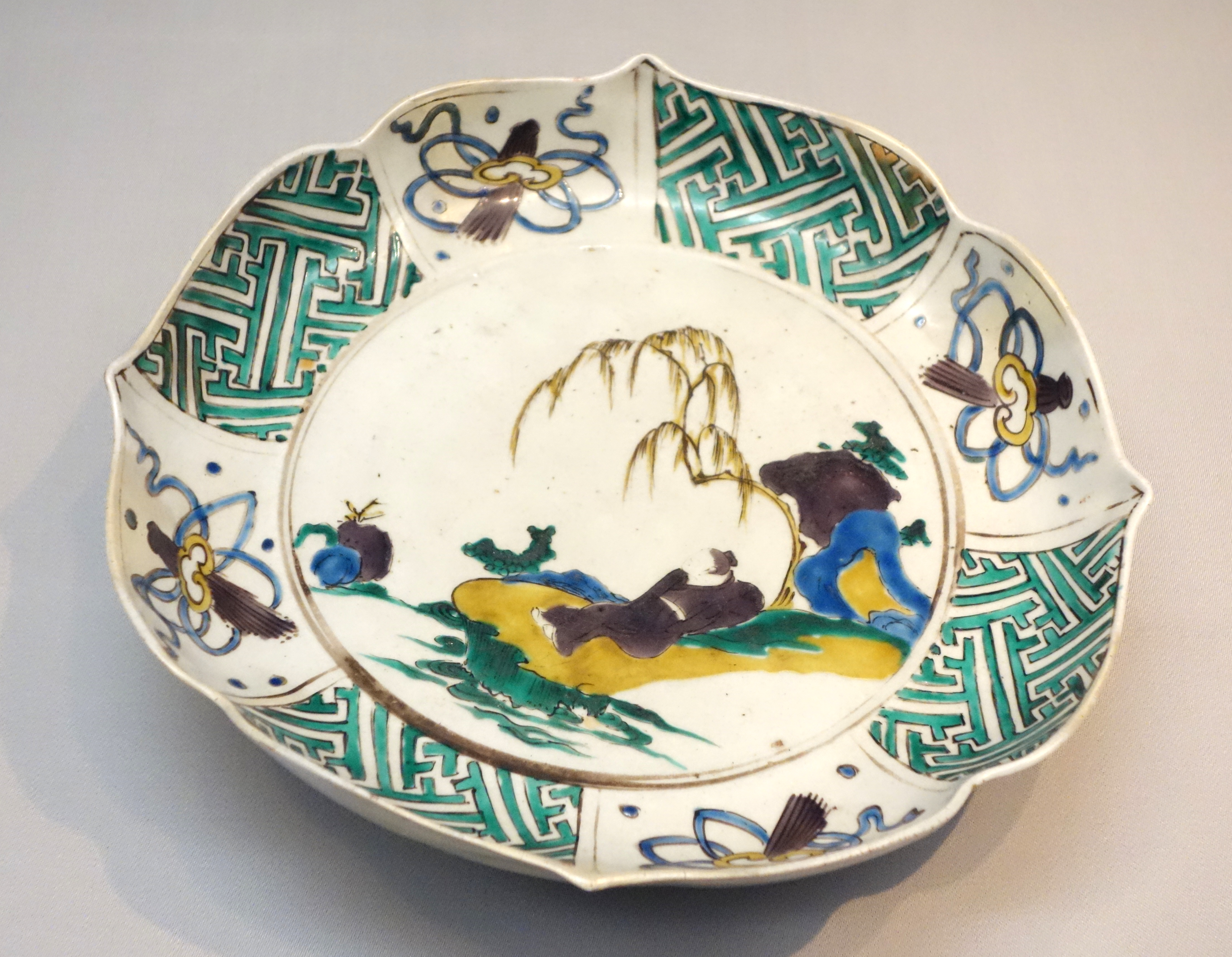
A lighter Ko-Kutani dish, 17th-century

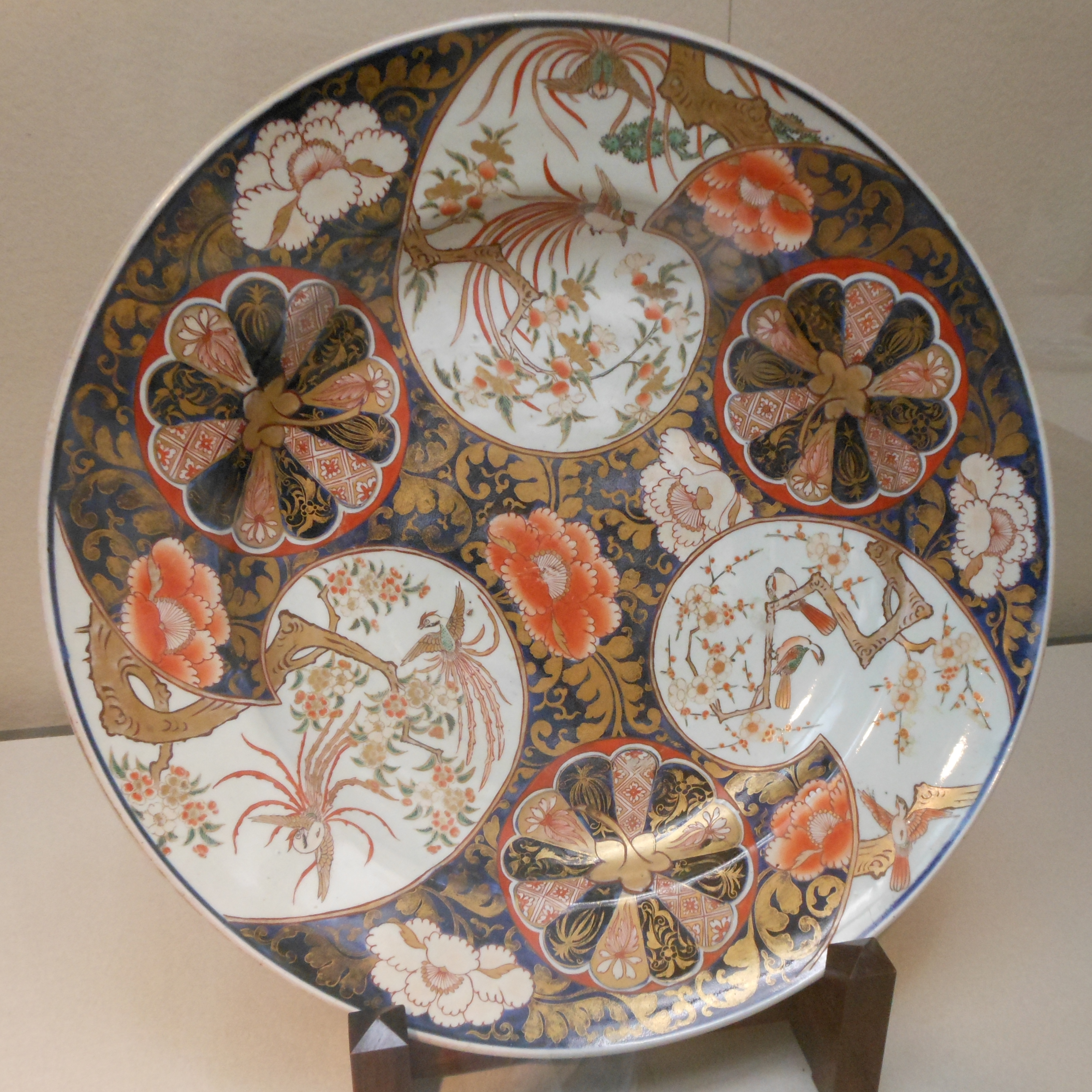
Ko-Imari dish, 1700–1740

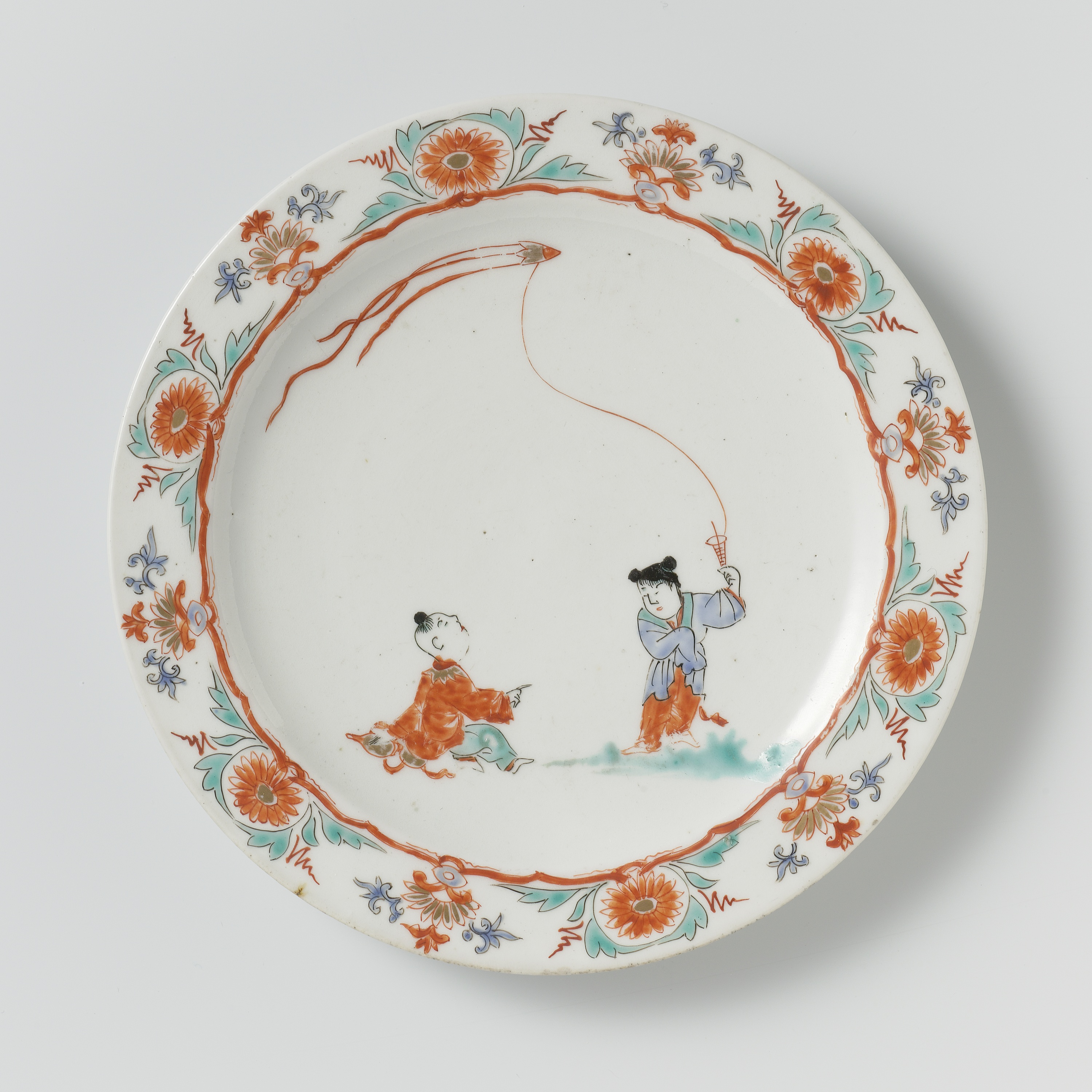
Kakiemon style, 1675–1700

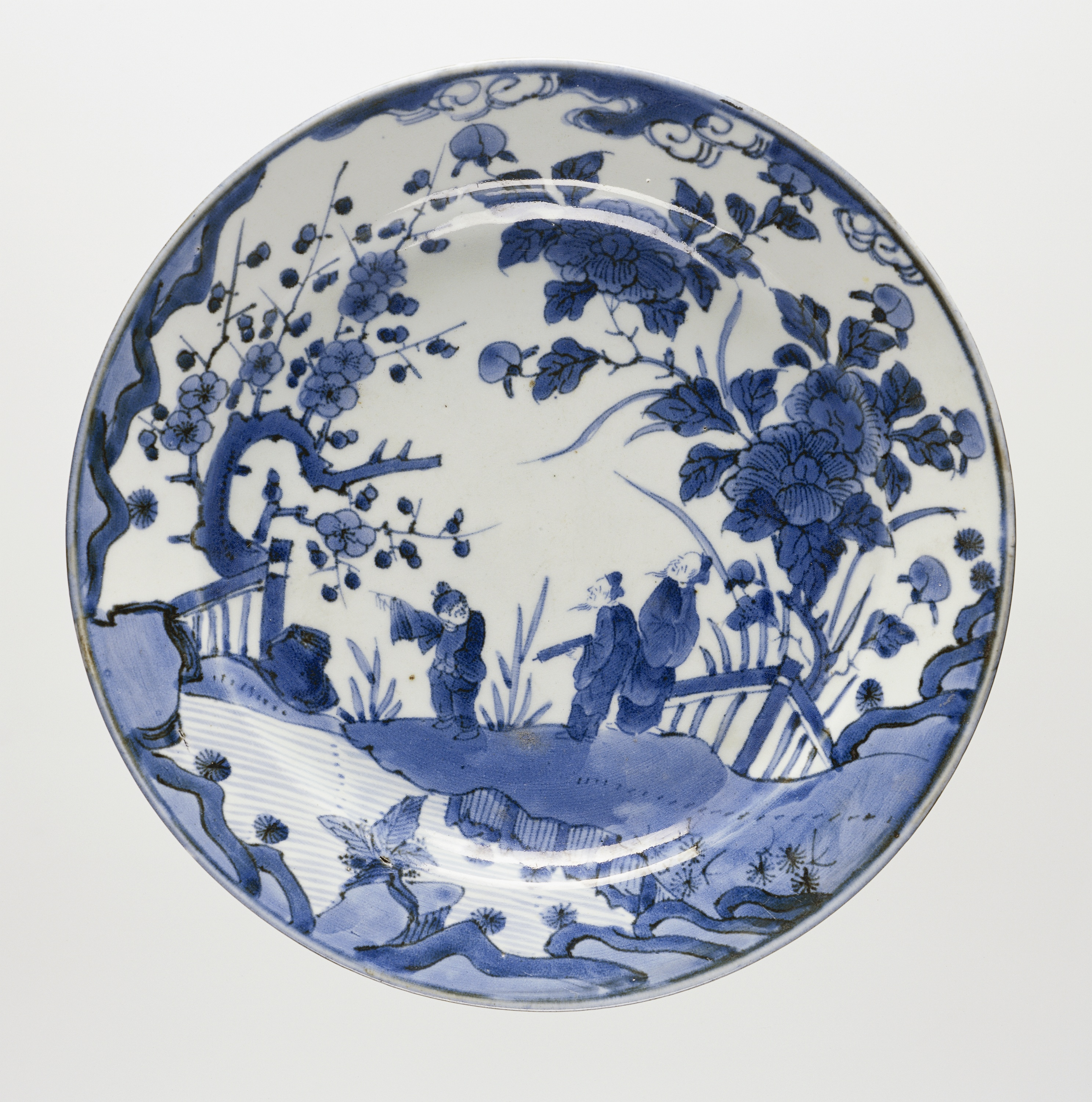
Arita ware dish in underglaze blue, 1675–1725

== Later period ==
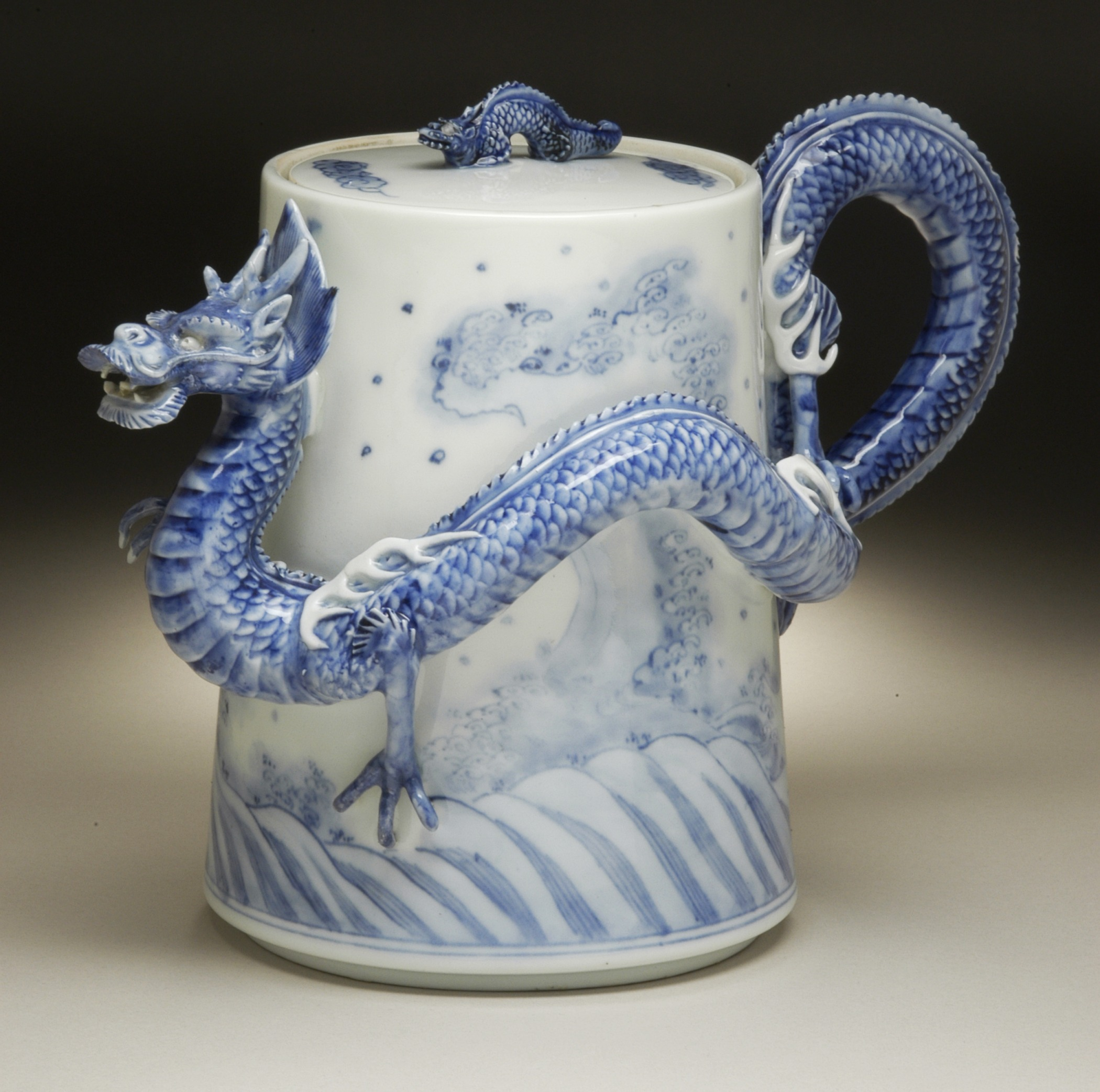
Elaborate "sencha ewer or export teapot", Hirado ware, second half 19th century

There was a considerable revival after the Ansei Treaties of the 1850s reopened general trade with Japan. In particular, the Japanese pavilion at the Paris Exposition Universelle of 1867 had a great effect on the European public, featuring Satsuma ware (then still earthenware) and other ceramics rather more in Japanese native taste than the earlier export wares. This was the start of the Japonisme taste that had a strong influence for the rest of the century. Japanese pottery and porcelain had continued to develop, or in many cases retain its traditional styles, during the period of minimal exports, and the earlier development of the wares that rapidly found new export markets is often unclear.

Imari wares had continued to develop for the domestic market and once again became very popular in Europe, and now America. The quality of 19th-century versions varies hugely, from the very crudely painted to extremely fine pieces from the best factories. Satsuma ware had begun as decorated earthenware, and was not significantly exported in the early period. But it was shown in Paris, and the local feudal lord had political connections in the West, and it became the most successful export ware, having mostly converted to a porcelain body. Late 19th-century wares were very heavily decorated, of variable quality, and much criticised on aesthetic grounds at the time and subsequently. Kutani ware also had a complicated history, and in this period was produced as both porcelain and earthenware for export. Hirado ware, in a very fine white porcelain, had been a development of the gap between the export periods, and was much used for small figures and complicated forms, often using openwork, which the fine material was suited to.

The Japanese porcelain-makers rather over-reached themselves, and in the 1880s there was something of an over-reaction, and Japanese porcelain acquired a reputation for poor quality, and prices and demand fell. Cheap wares could sell, but the better quality wares suffered, although small amounts of the highest quality wares found a market. This situation largely continued until World War II. In the post-war period most Japanese exports were now in modern Western styles as interpreted by the larger Japanese companies.

== Distinguishing domestic and export wares ==
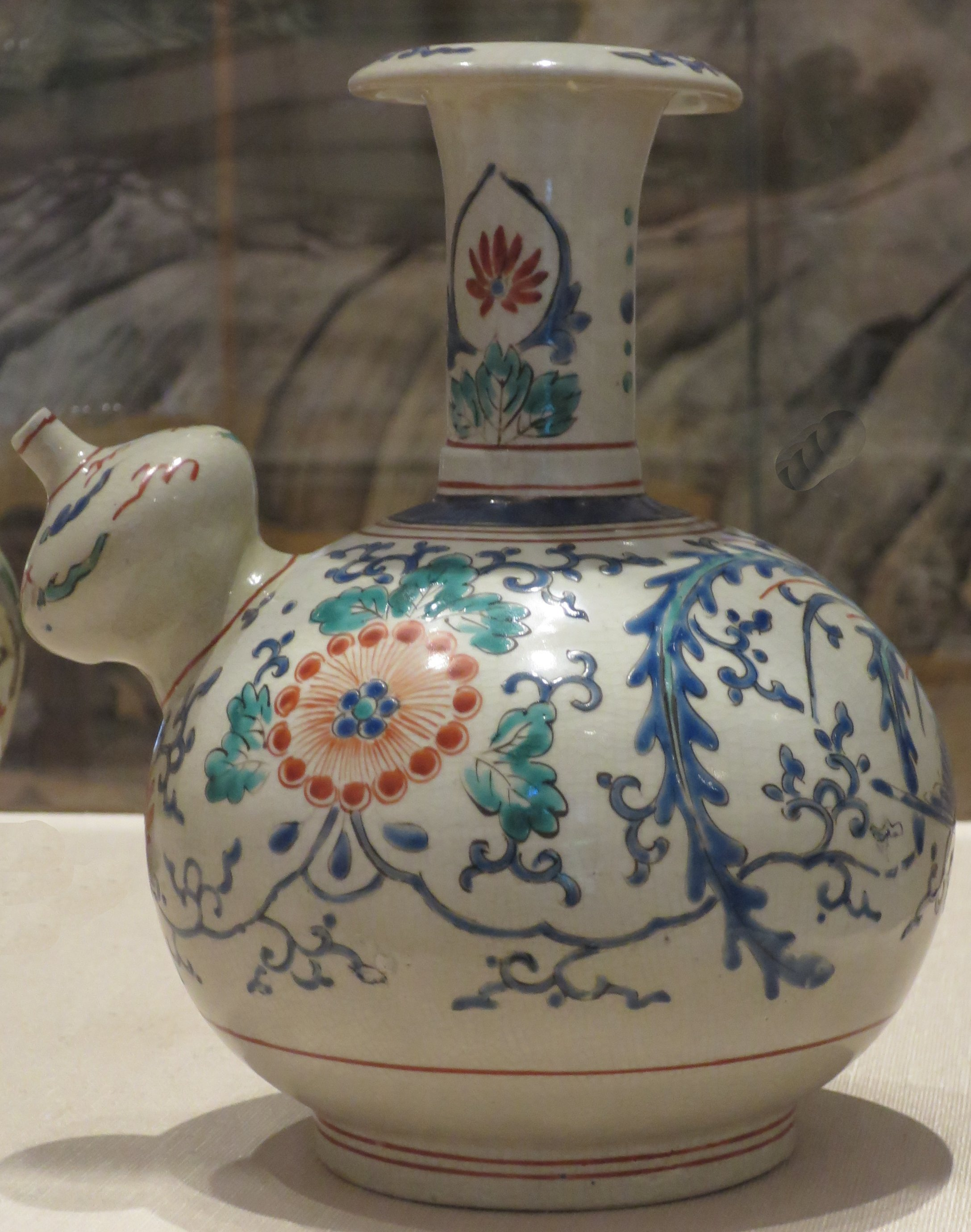
Kendi for southeast Asian markets, 17th century

It is usually, but not always, possible for an expert to tell from the object itself whether it was made for the domestic market or export. Some shapes are certainly European, including shaving-bowls with a crescent-shaped cut-out for the neck, coffee pots and other shapes based on European silverware shapes, "apothecary bottles", bottles in imitation of European glass shapes, and others. Some pieces were shipped to Europe as plain "blanks", and given overglaze decoration there, usually in Holland, or given metal mounts in Europe; these may even be dated, which is especially useful for historians. Many export ewers were given holes at the top of the neck to facilitate the mounts, but were never mounted.

Other pieces carry initials or inscriptions, especially the "VOC" (for Vereenigde Oostindische Compagnie) monogram of the Dutch East India Company. Some pieces can be documented back to the period in old European collections, such as a Kakiemon elephant recorded at Burghley House in England in 1688, and still there. Although this becomes ever less useful, early period pieces that have a provenance going back a century or more, especially from places in India, southeast Asia or the Middle East, are likely to have been exported to that area after production. Some shapes were especially made for non-European export markets; the Islamic world wanted large platters for rice-based dishes served communally, and the kendi (or "gargolet") is a distinctive southeast Asian type of drinking or pouring vessel with two openings, one at the top of the neck, and the other lower on the body, with a rounded protuberance. Some pieces have old Middle Eastern metal mounts.

The painted decoration of pieces also gives strong indications of the intended destination, either by copying European styles, or using a style that appealed to Japanese taste, but was assumed to not appeal to Europeans. But interpretations of Chinese styles might be intended for either market, though generally the quality of painting is better on domestic wares. In the later period, much production for export was poorly and over-elaborately made and painted.

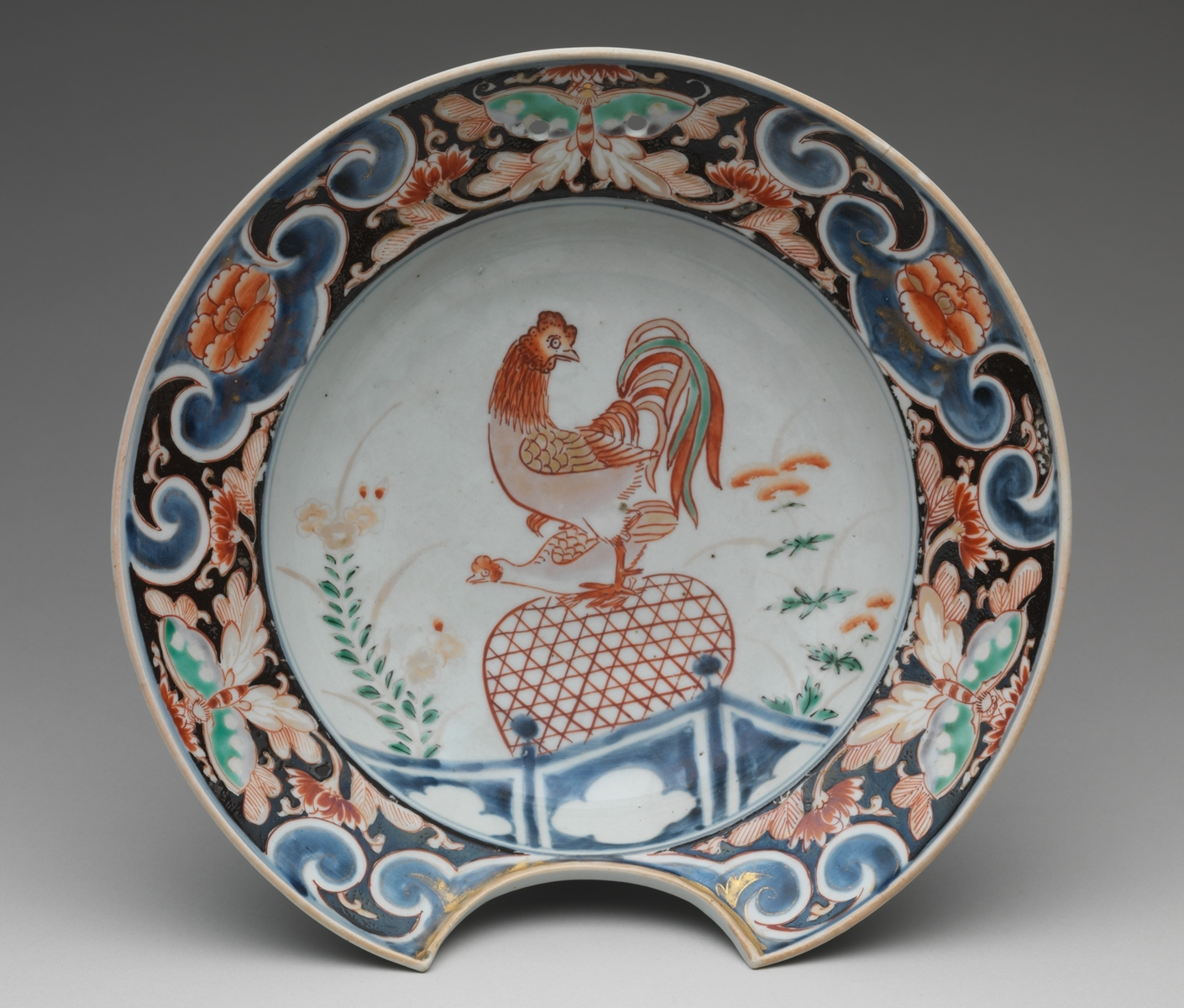
The European shape of a barber's shaving basin bowl, with copulating cock, around 1700

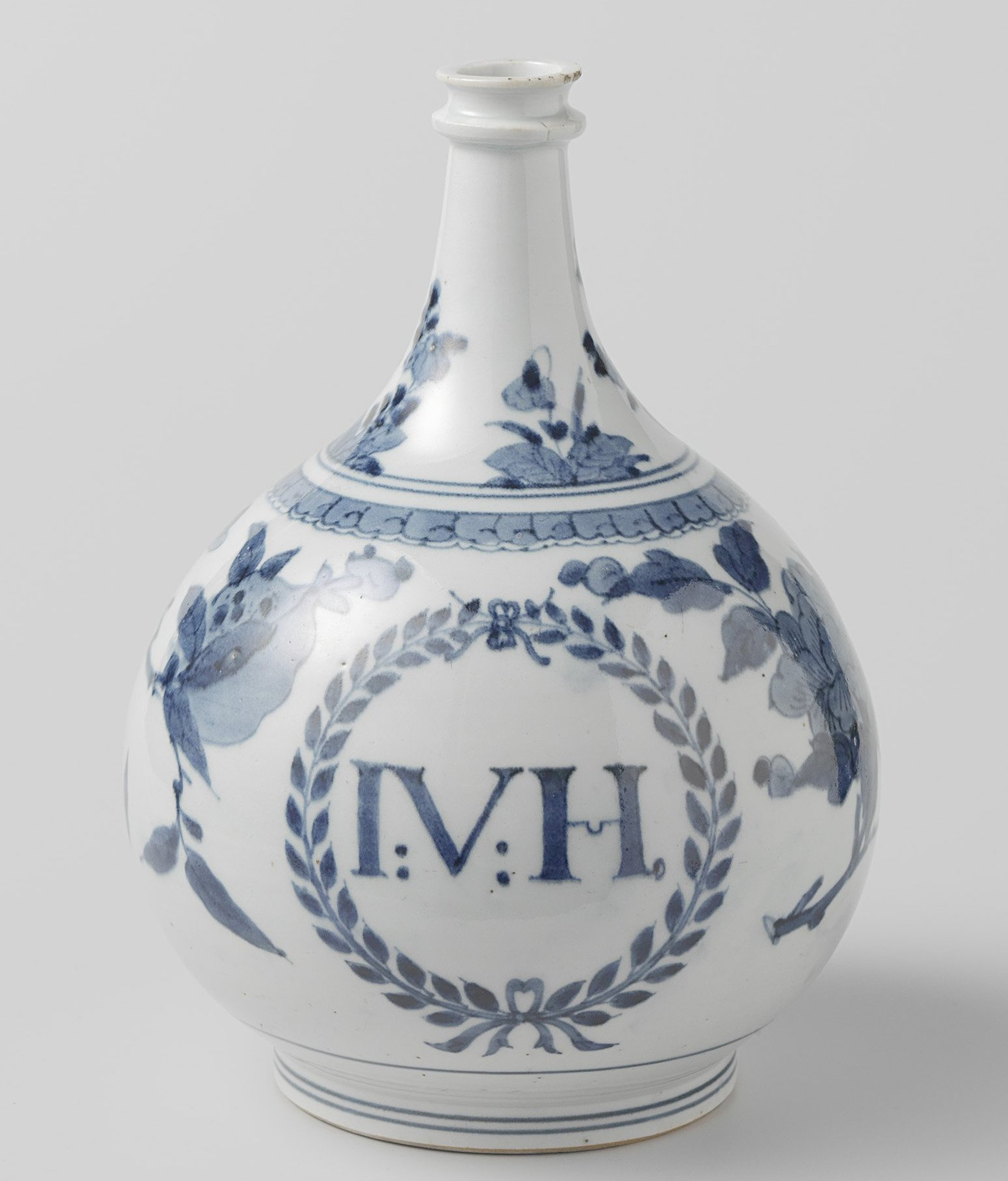
Bottle with Western monogram, 1690–1710

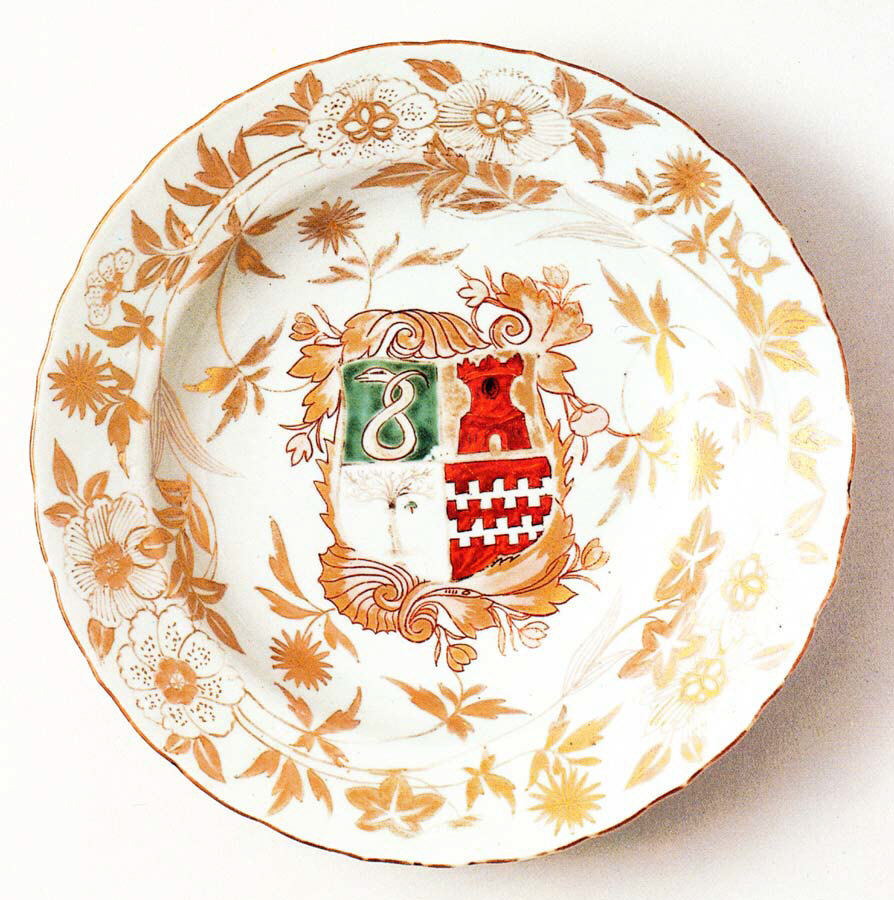
18th-century armorial ware plate; far less common than from China

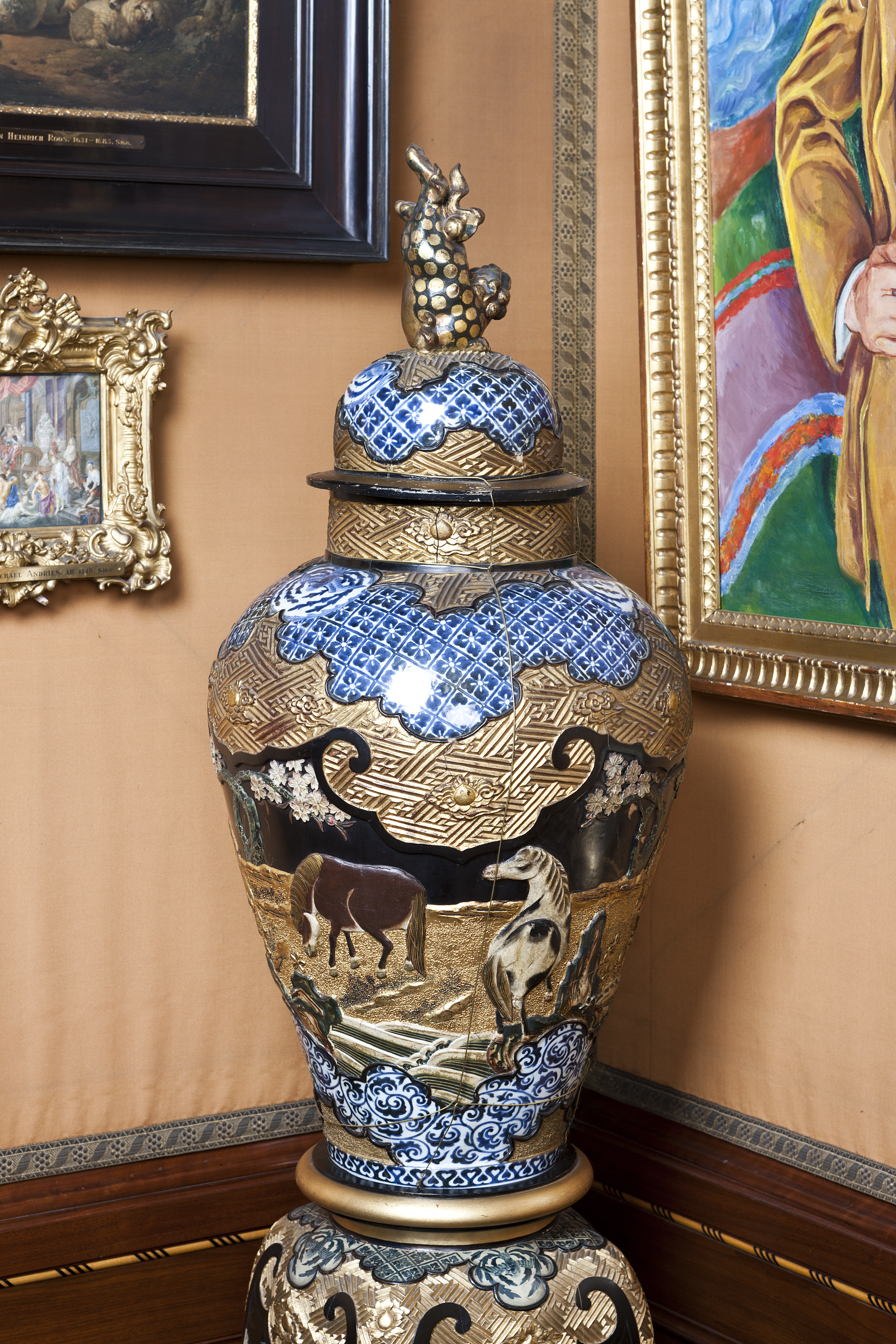
Large fancy vase of a type only made for export, c. 1700; this once belonged to the King of Sweden.

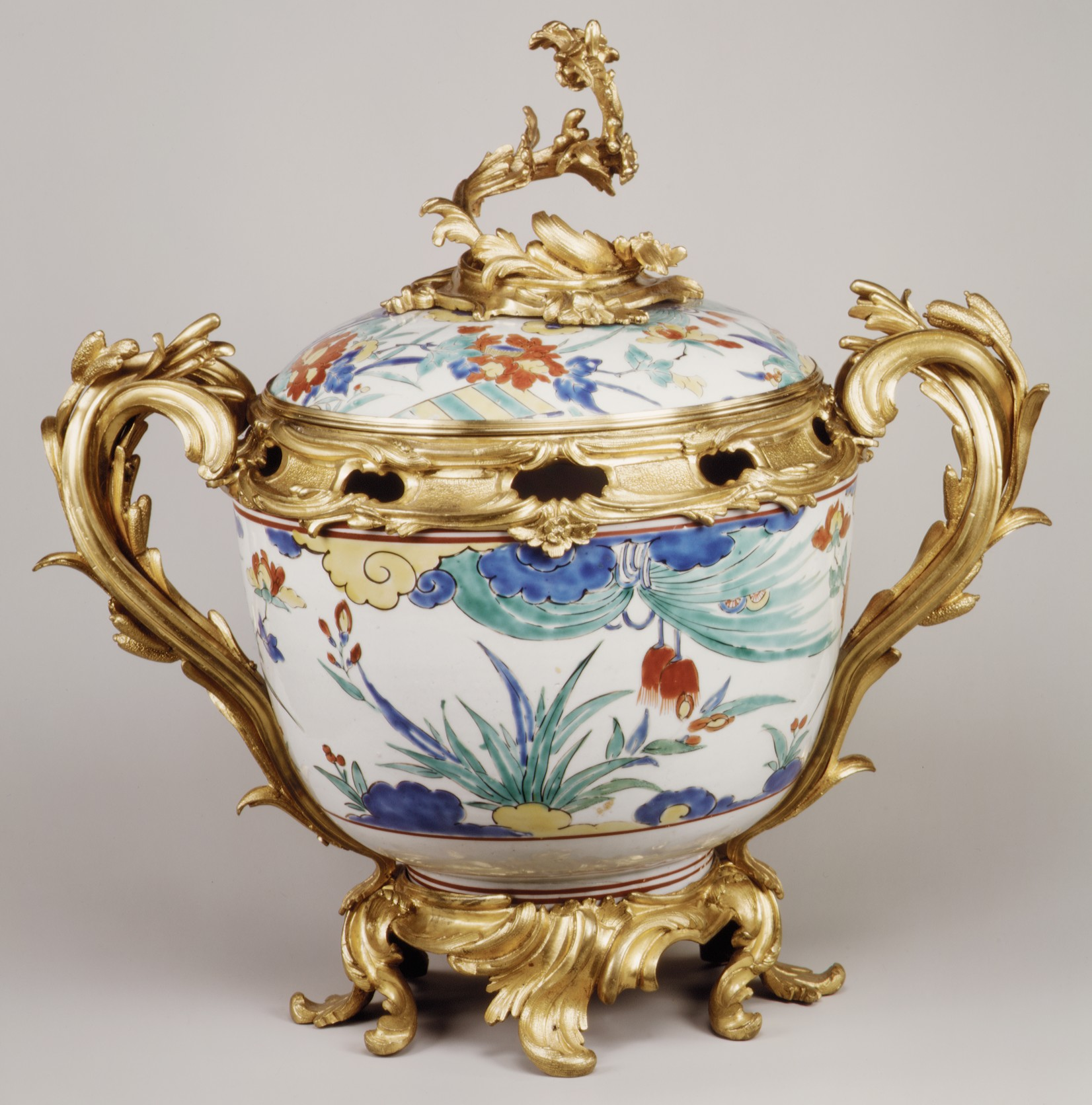
Potpourri bowl with cover (one of a pair), porcelain late 17th century, French ormolu mounts c. 1745–1750

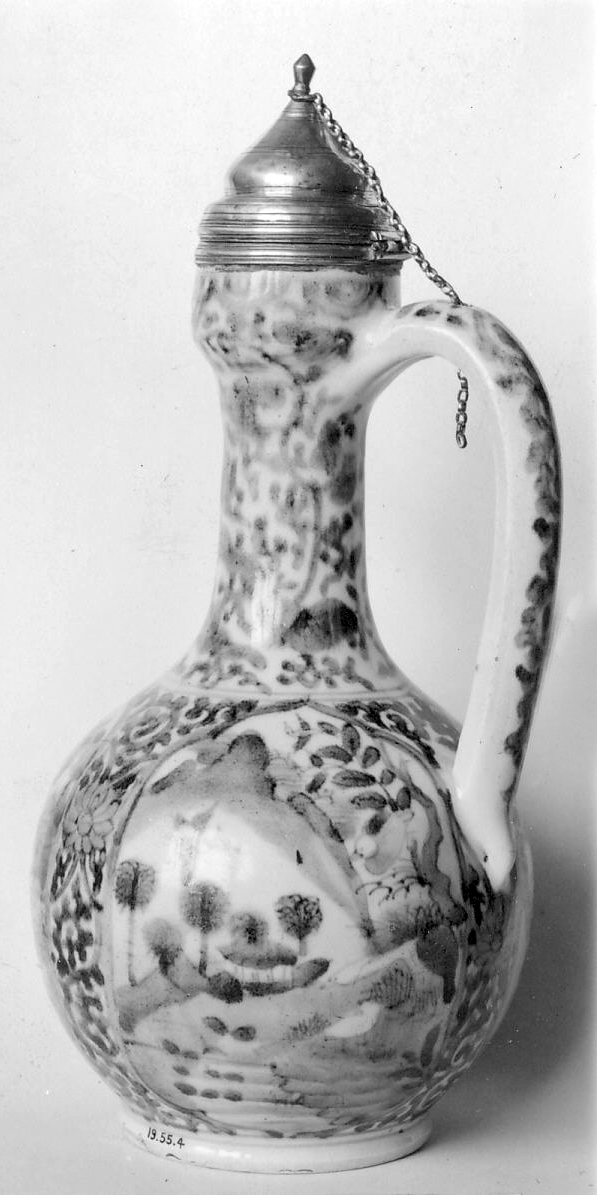
Arita ware jug with Middle Eastern mounts, 1660–1680
