= Yabu Meizan =

Japanese ceramic artist

- 藪 明山
- Born: Yabu Masashichi; January 20, 1853; Nagahori, Osaka
- Died: May 2, 1934 (aged 81)
- Known for: Satsuma ware

Yabu Meizan (Japanese: 藪 明山, birth name Yabu Masashichi (藪 政七), January 20, 1853 – May 2, 1934) was a Japanese artist and workshop owner known for painting on porcelain. His studio in Osaka produced high-end Satsuma ware primarily for the export market. He is known for highly detailed works that combined large numbers of human or animal figures in a single scene, as well as for works that bore just one motif. He won awards at, a succession of exhibitions both in Japan and internationally and took part in organising some exhibitions.

The term "Satsuma ware" was originally coined for artistic painted porcelain from Satsuma Province. Eventually it expanded to include low-quality porcelain that was mass-produced for export. Meizan was one of the artists who did not sacrifice quality. He is regarded as the "prince" of this medium and today his works are sought after by collectors.

== Biography ==
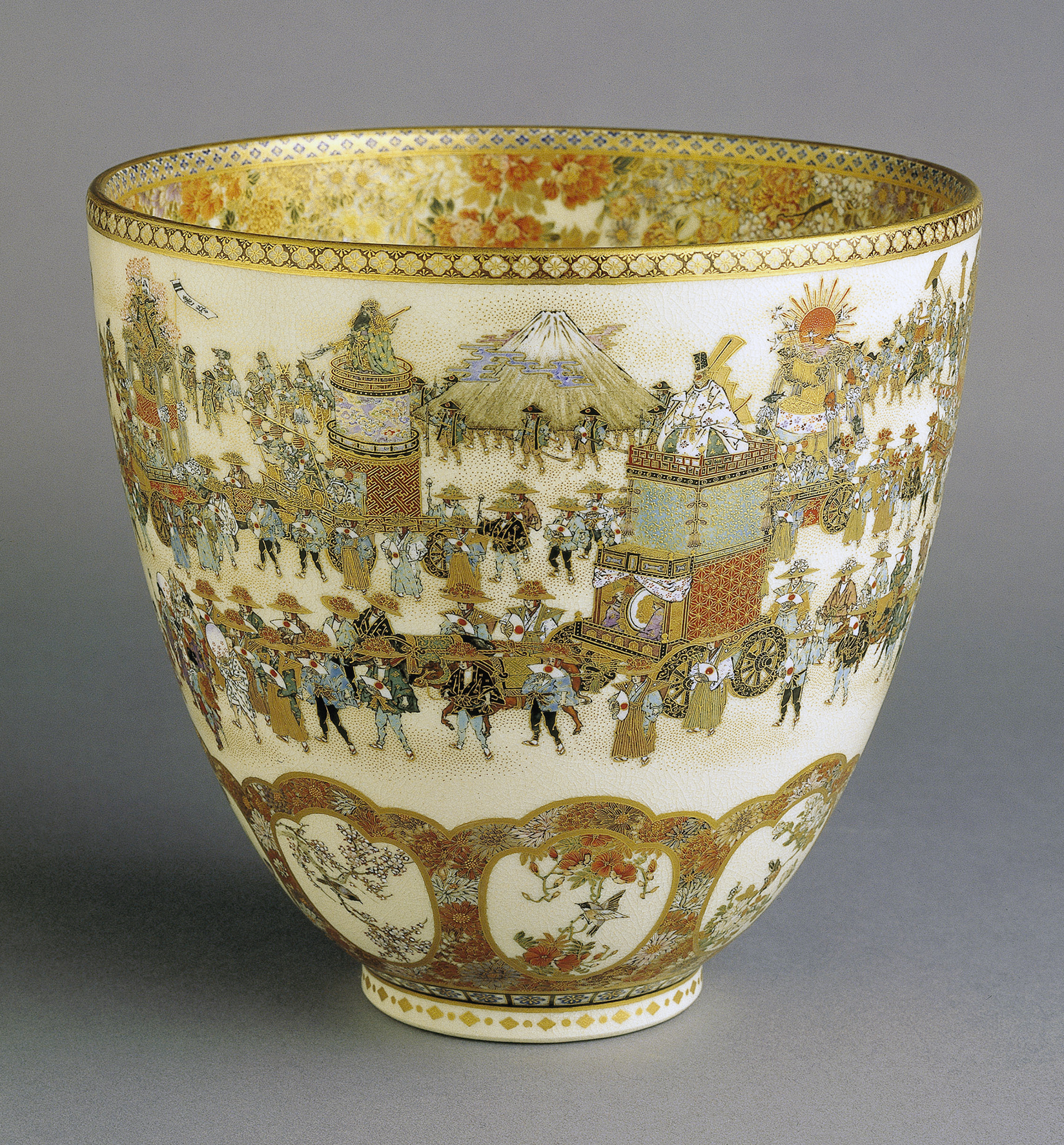
Bowl painted and gilded, c. 1910

Yabu Meizan was born on January 20, 1853, in Nagahori, Osaka. He was the son of the painter Yabu Chosui and the grandson of the scholar Yabu Kakudō. In 1880 he went to Tokyo to learn about pottery painting, then returned to Osaka to open the workshop where he employed and trained other artists. Blank pottery pieces from the kiln of Chin Jukan in Satsuma Province were brought to Osaka to be decorated.

From 1885 onwards his works were sold in the United States, where they were known as "Meizan pottery". In 1888, orders surged as a result of Meizan developing a distinctive style, as well as wider conditions. Japan was recovering from economic recession and the Satsuma ware style was becoming very popular.

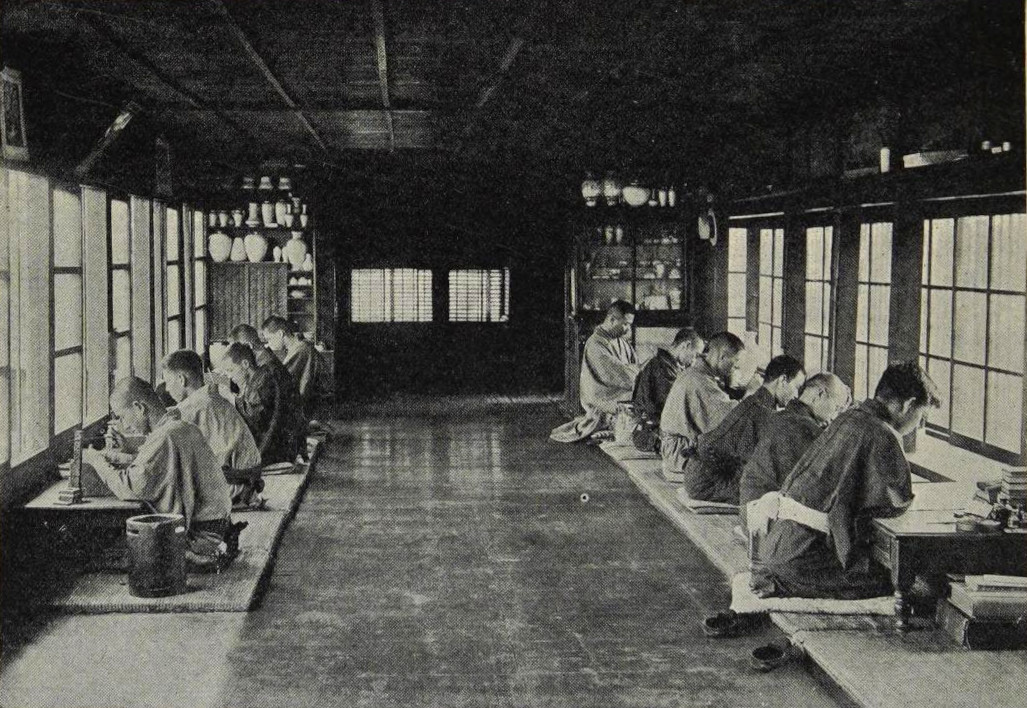
Yabu Meizan's workshop in 1910

The American art museum founder Charles Parsons recounts a visit to Meizan's workshop in his book Notes of a Trip around the World in 1894 and 1895.

"He is very celebrated. He had 17 men and boys at work, all decorating. He makes the designs and watches them carefully in executing the work. Some are very wonderful workers. All is order, neatness and silence, no words spoken."

Meizan was head of the Osaka Art Society. He actively marketed his work internationally as well as domestically, taking an active role in organising the presentation of Japanese wares at world's fairs. This led to acclaim as well as sales. His success inspired another workshop to use his name and imitate his style, without matching his subtlety or detail. His career declined during World War I as the war and economic turmoil made it difficult to run an export business. Japanese art was also falling out of favour with American and European buyers, who gradually turned to China. Yabu Meizan's workshop finally closed in 1926. A dedicated Christian, he became a warden of the Naniwa Church in that year. Yabu Tsuneo, Meizan's adopted son, took over the workshop after his father's retirement and started to use the "Meizan" signature on his own works. In 1929 and 1932, private exhibitions were put on for the emperor when he visited Osaka; Meizan contributed several of his works. Meizan died on May 2, 1934.

== Style ==
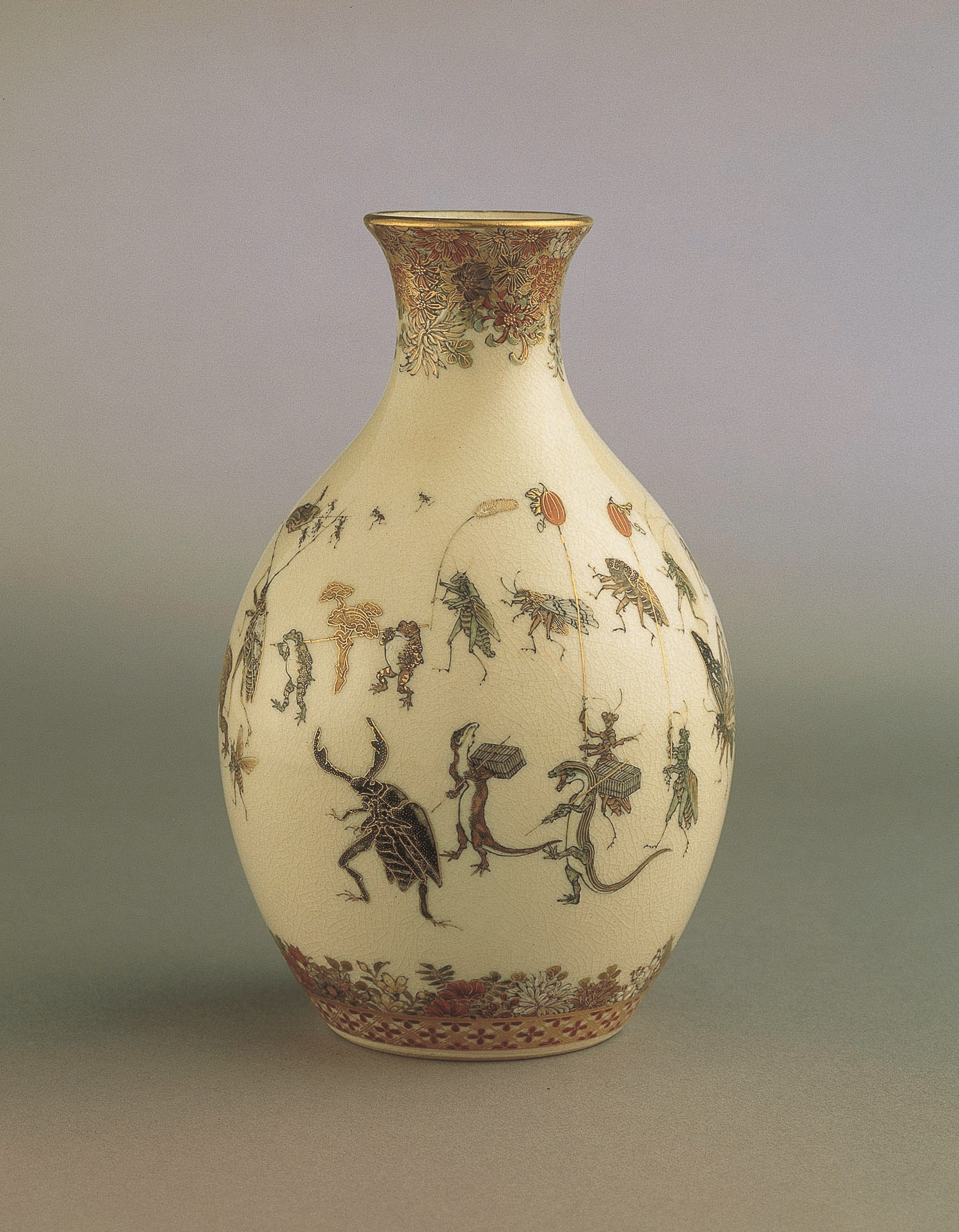
Vase with an insect procession, c. 1910

Meizan's works are the most meticulously decorated Satsuma wares. This highly detailed decoration was applied using copper plate designs. Engraved copper plates were used to print the designs on paper, which were then cut to provide stencils for painting on vases or plates. His decorations used Chinese and Buddhist subjects until the 1890s, when he adopted more Japanese symbolism, such as fishermen or fighting samurai. He drew from or copied popular prints by artists including Hiroshige. His work was influenced by the landscape art made in and around Kyoto and Osaka, with Mount Fuji and other landmarks appearing as subjects.

Over time, the designs included more and more detail. A single work might depict thousands or flowers or butterflies, or hundreds of people in a procession. Towards the end of his career he took a different approach, covering whole vases in a single motif. This new artistic direction, which may have been inspired by critics' opinions, was a commercial failure at the time; buyers much preferred the crowded style.

== Exhibitions ==
From 1885 to 1916, Meizan displayed his art at a number of national exhibitions and world's fairs, winning multiple medals. These included the Fourteenth Kyoto Exhibition of 1885 (where he won a bronze medal), the World's Columbian Exposition at Chicago in 1893, the Paris Exposition Universelle of 1899 and again in 1900, the Fifth National Industrial Exhibition at Osaka in 1903, the Louisiana Purchase Exhibition of 1904 (where he won a gold medal), the Lewis and Clark Centennial Exposition at Portland, Oregon in 1905, and the London Japan–British Exhibition of 1910. For the Louisiana Purchase Exhibition, Meizan was appointed as secretary of the Japan Exhibits Association, organising the arrangement and decoration of the hall. His final international exhibition was the 1915 Panama–Pacific International Exposition in San Francisco.

Outside of Japan a large collection of his art forms part of the Khalili Collection of Japanese Art. The Walters Art Museum, Victoria and Albert Museum in South Kensington, and the Metropolitan Museum of Art also hold pieces. Works by Meizan were included in exhibitions drawn from the Khalili Collections at the National Museum of Wales, Cardiff, in 1994 and 1995; in the Wilmington Arts Centre, Delaware, in 1999; the Portland Art Museum in 2002; and in the Van Gogh Museum, Amsterdam, in 2006.

== Gallery ==
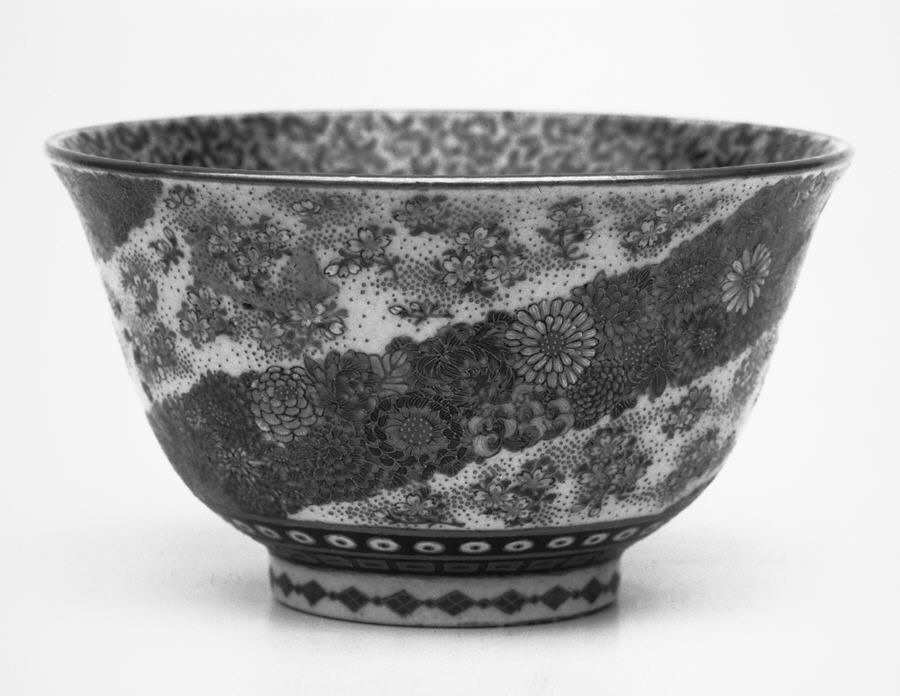
Bowl, late 19th century

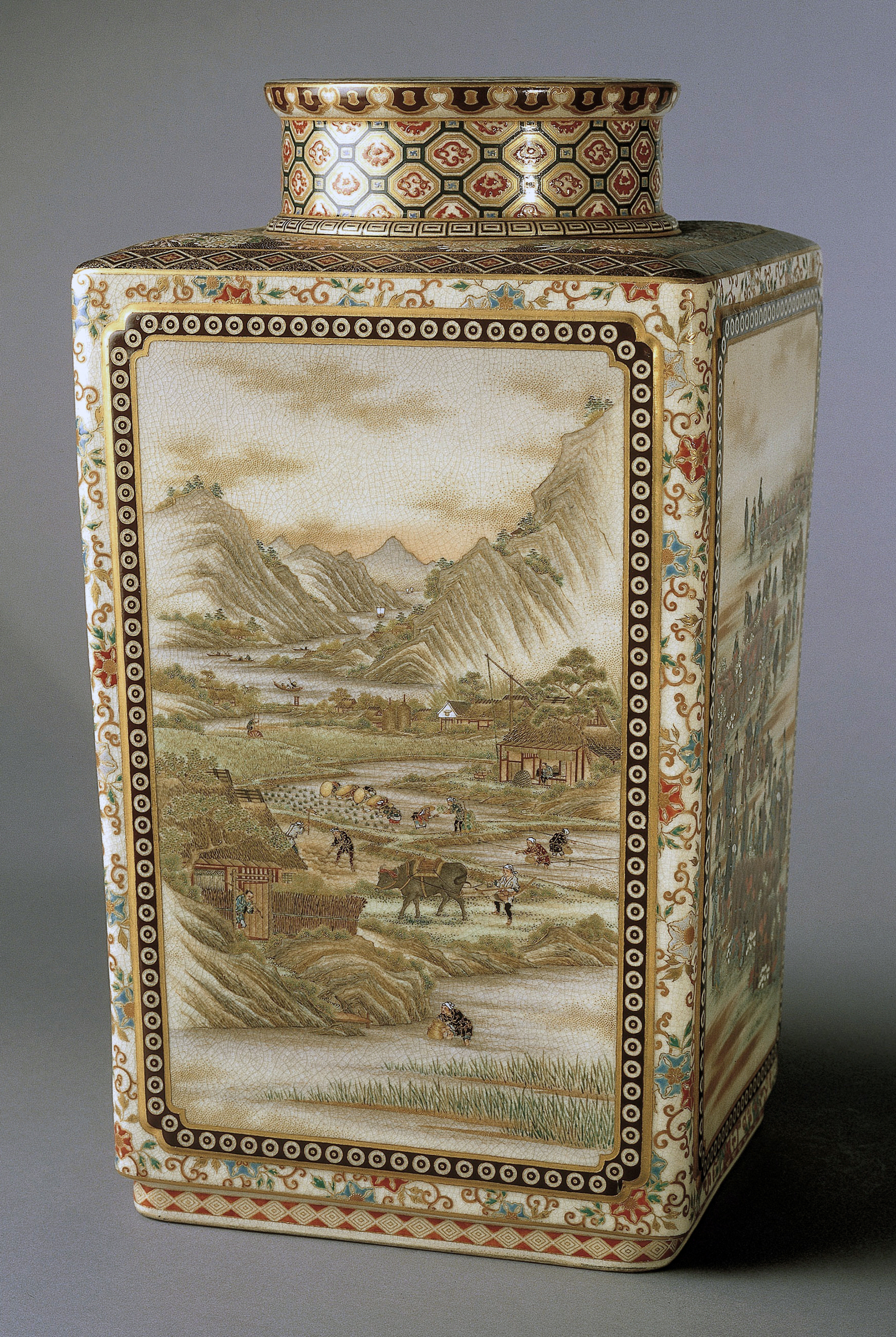
Vase, c. 1890

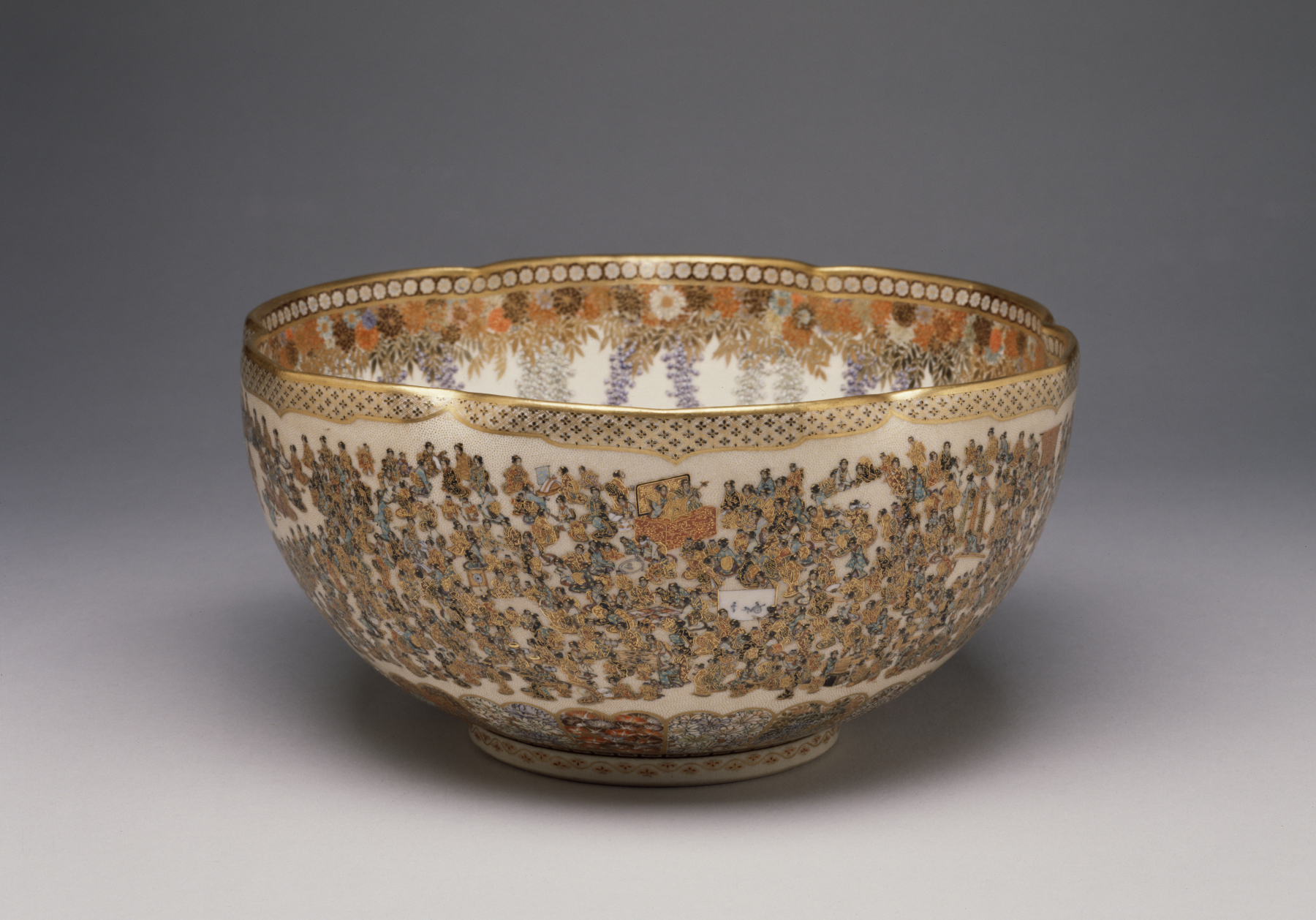
Bowl with a multitude of women, c. 1904

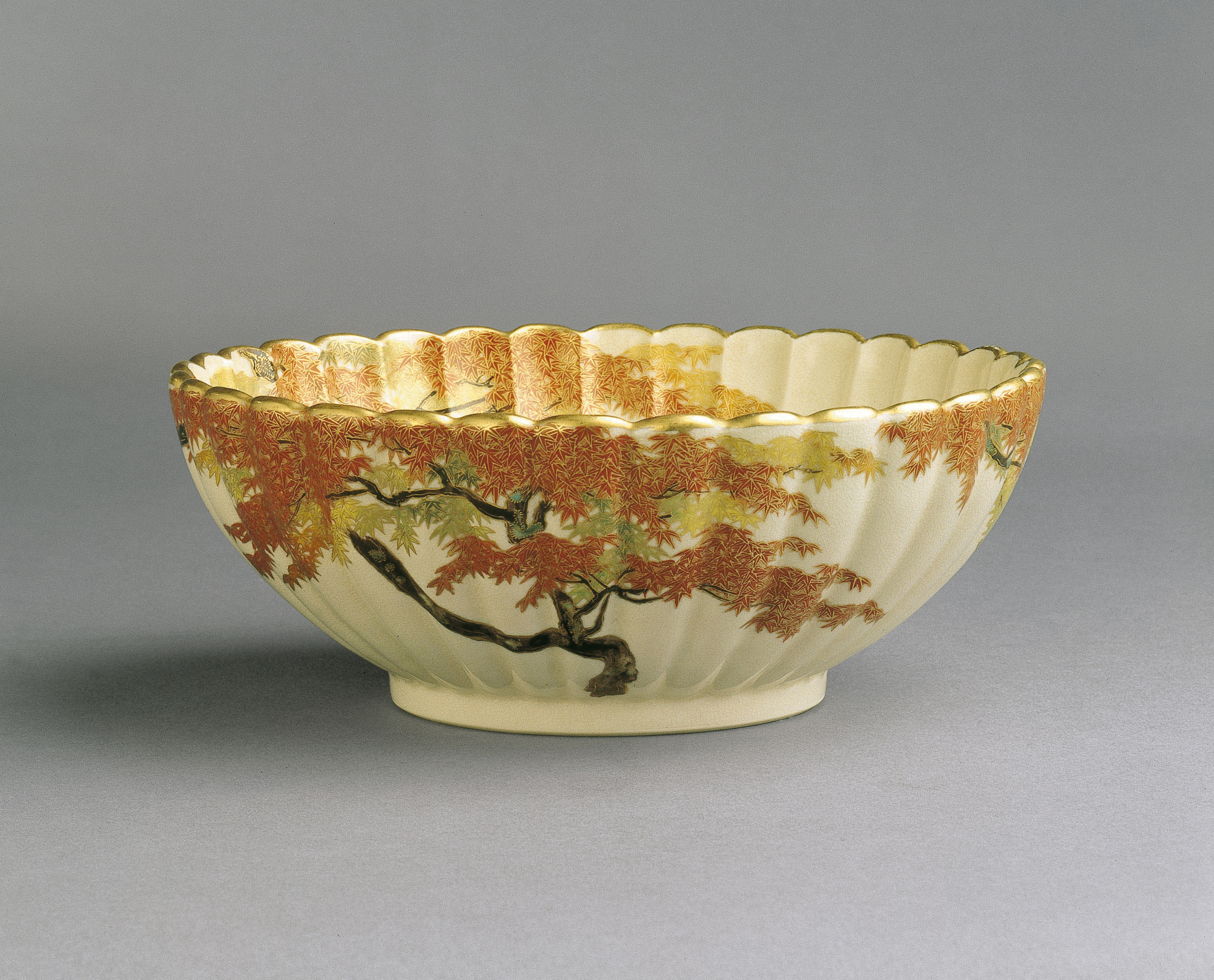
Bowl, c. 1910
