= Satsuma ware =

Type of Japanese pottery

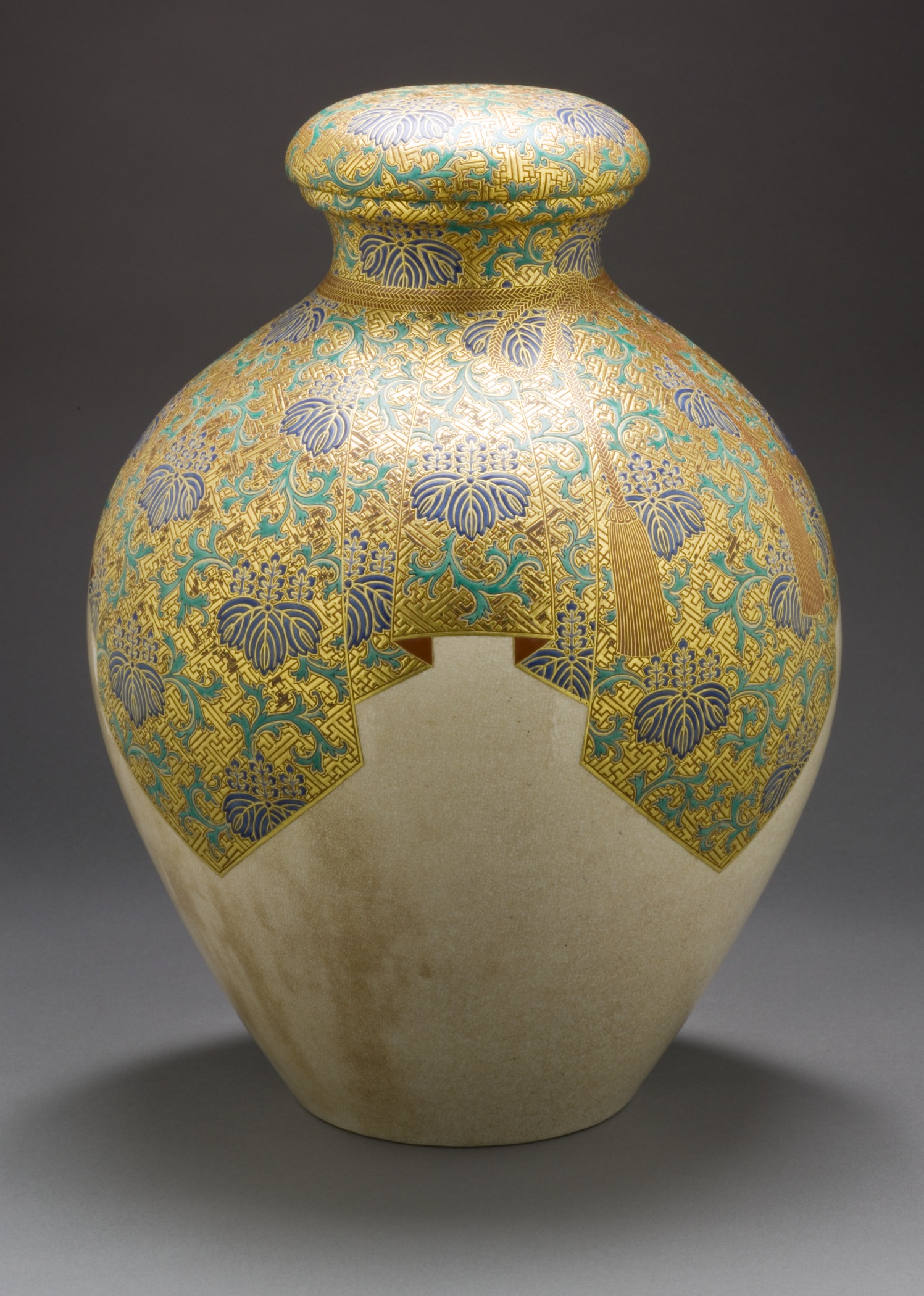
Satsuma earthenware tea storage jar (chatsubo) with paulownia and thunder pattern, late Edo period, circa 1800–1850

Satsuma ware (薩摩焼, Satsuma-yaki) is a type of Japanese pottery originally from Satsuma Province, southern Kyūshū. Today, it can be divided into two distinct categories: the original plain dark clay early Satsuma (古薩摩, Ko-Satsuma) made in Satsuma from around 1600, and the elaborately decorated export Satsuma (京薩摩, Kyō-Satsuma) ivory-bodied pieces which began to be produced in the nineteenth century in various Japanese cities. By adapting their gilded polychromatic enamel overglaze designs to appeal to the tastes of western consumers, manufacturers of the latter made Satsuma ware one of the most recognized and profitable export products of Japan for centuries, and even became one of the key sources of funding for the Meiji period reforms.

== Early history ==
Most scholars date Satsuma ware's appearance to the late sixteenth or early seventeenth century. In 1597–1598, at the conclusion of Toyotomi Hideyoshi's incursions into Korea, Korean potters, which at the time were highly regarded for their contributions to ceramics and the Korean ceramics industry, were captured and forcefully brought to Japan to kick-start Kyūshū's non-existent ceramic industry. Hagi ware and Arita ware (Yi Sam-pyeong) share similar peninsular origins.

The Satsuma region happened to be a great spot for the development of kilns due to its access to local clay and proximity to the Korean Peninsula. These potters eventually mainly settled in Naeshirogawa and Tateno, which were to become the hub of the local pottery industry. Of the Korean potters settled in Japan which revolutionized Japanese pottery, members of the well known Shim (심 沈) clan, who is now headed by the 15th generation Shim Su-gwan (Chin Jukan, 심수관, 沈壽官), have continued to make the Chin Jukan-brand pottery to this day, making sales offline and online, while keeping his ancestral identity by holding Korean ceremonies in traditional Joseon attire, and have attempted to improve Korean-Japanese relations by speaking in public and holding exhibits.

== Early Satsuma ware ==
Satsuma ware dating up to the first years of the Genroku era (1688–1704) is often referred to as Early Satsuma or ko-satsuma. The oldest remaining examples of Satsuma are stoneware made from iron-rich dark clay covered in dark glaze. Prior to 1790, pieces were not ornately decorated, but rather humble articles of folk-ware intended for practical everyday use in largely rustic environments or the tea ceremony. Given that they were "largely destined for use in gloomy farmhouse kitchens", potters often relied on tactile techniques such as raised relief, stamp impressions and clay carving to give pieces interest.

The intense popularity of Satsuma ware outside Japan in the late nineteenth century resulted in an increase in production coupled with a decrease in quality. Collectors sought older, more refined pieces of what they erroneously referred to as early Satsuma. These were in fact simply better-quality pre-Meiji nineteenth-century pieces, works from other potteries such as Kyoto's Awata ware (粟田焼, Awata-yaki), or counterfeits.

== 1800–1867 ==
From around 1800, brocade (錦手, nishikide) painted decoration began to flourish, including a palette of "delicate iron-red, a glossy blue, a bluish green, a soft purple black, and a yellow very sparingly used". A slightly later innovation added painted gilding to the brocade (金錦手, kin nishikide). The multi-coloured enamel overglaze and gold were painted on delicate, ivory-bodied pieces with a finely crackled transparent glaze. The designs—often light, simple floral patterns—were highly influenced by both Kyoto pottery and the Kanō school of painting, resulting in an emphasis on negative space. Many believe this came from Satsuma potters visiting Kyoto in the late seventeenth century to learn overglaze painting techniques.

== 1867–1885 ==
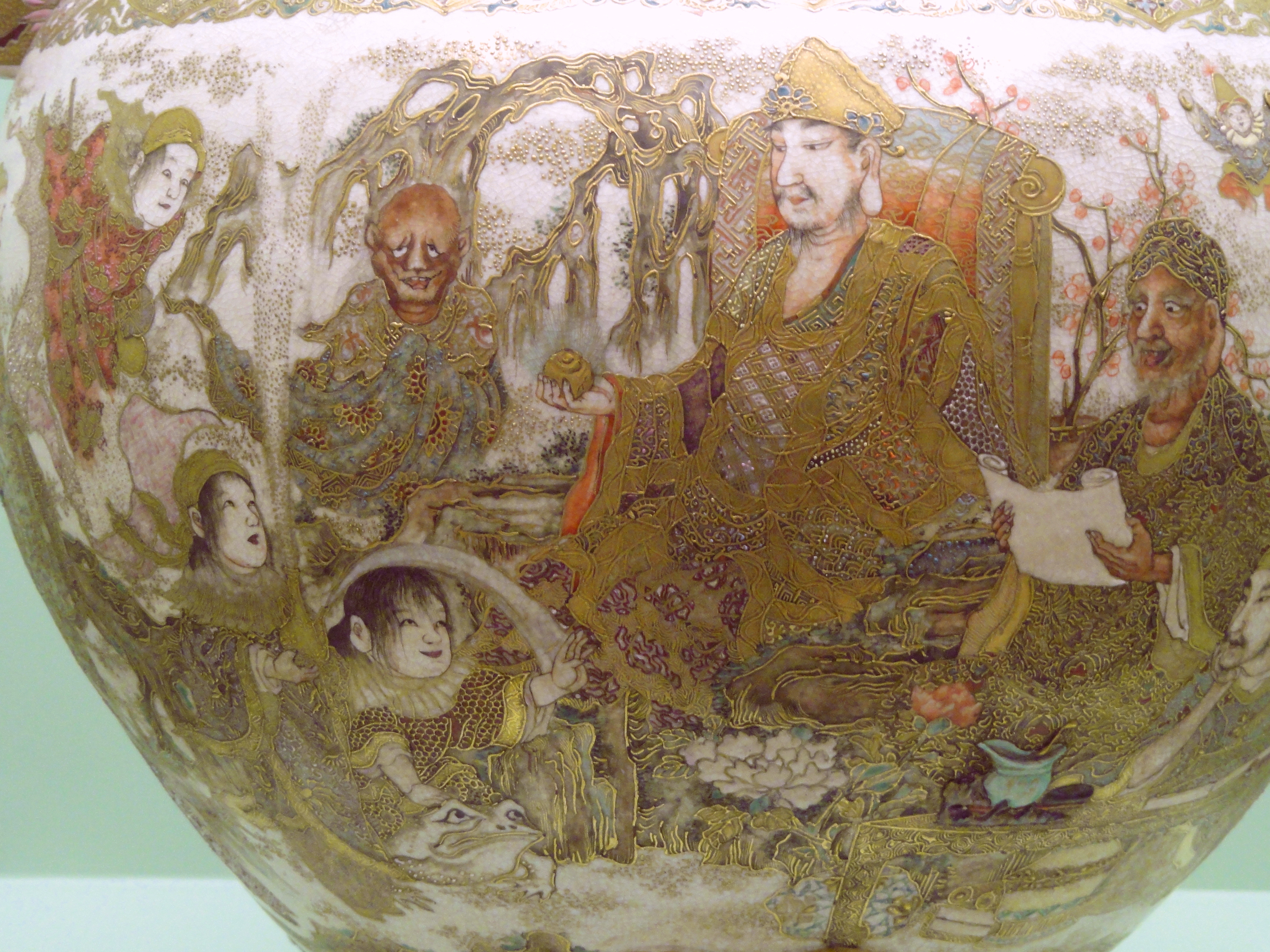
Satsuma bowl detail c. 1870

The first major presentation of Japanese arts and culture to the West was at Paris' Exposition Universelle in 1867, and Satsuma ware figured prominently among the items displayed. The region's governor, the daimyō, understood early the economic, prestige and political advantages of a trade relationship with the West. In order to maintain its connection with Satsuma, for example, Britain offered support to the Daimyō in the 1868 rebellion against the shogunate. The Paris Exposition showcased Satsuma's ceramics, lacquerware, wood, tea ceremony implements, bamboo wicker and textiles under Satsuma's regional banner—rather than Japan's—as a sign of the Daimyō's antipathy to the national shogunate.

Following the popularity of Satsuma ware at the 1867 exhibition and its mention in Audsley and Bowes' Keramic Art of Japan in 1875, the two major workshops producing these pieces, those headed by Boku Seikan and Chin Jukan, were joined by a number of others across Japan. "Satsuma" ceased to be a geographical marker and began to convey an aesthetic. By 1873, etsuke (絵付け) workshops specializing in painting blank-glazed stoneware items from Satsuma had sprung up in Kobe and Yokohama. In places such as Kutani, Kyoto and Tokyo, workshops made their own blanks, eliminating any actual connection with Satsuma. From the early 1890s through the early 1920s there were more than twenty etsuke factories producing Satsuma ware, as well as a number of small, independent studios producing high-quality pieces.

Eager to tap into the burgeoning foreign market, producers adapted the nishikide Satsuma model. The resulting export style demonstrated an aesthetic thought to reflect foreign tastes. Items were covered with the millefleur-like 'flower-packed' (花詰, hanazume) pattern or 'filled-in painting' (塗りつぶし, nuritsubushi) to the point of horror vacui. They were typically decorated with "'quaint' ... symbols such as pagodas, folding fans, or kimono-clad [females]". Pieces continued to feature floral and bird designs, but religious, mythological, landscape and genre scenes also increased. There was new interest in producing decorative pieces (okimono), such as figurines of beautiful women (bijin), animals, children and religious subjects. The palette darkened, and there was generous application of moriage (盛り上げ) raised gold.

== 1885–1930s ==
The mid-1880s saw the beginning of an export slump for many Japanese goods, including Satsuma ware, linked in part to a depreciation of quality and novelty through mass production. By the 1890s, contemporary Satsuma ware had become generally denigrated by critics and collectors. It was negatively received at Chicago's Columbian Exposition of 1893, but remained a popular export commodity into the twentieth century, becoming "virtually synonymous with Japanese ceramics" throughout the Meiji period. Satsuma ware continued to be mass-produced through the modern period, though quality declined to the point where it eventually lost interest for consumers.

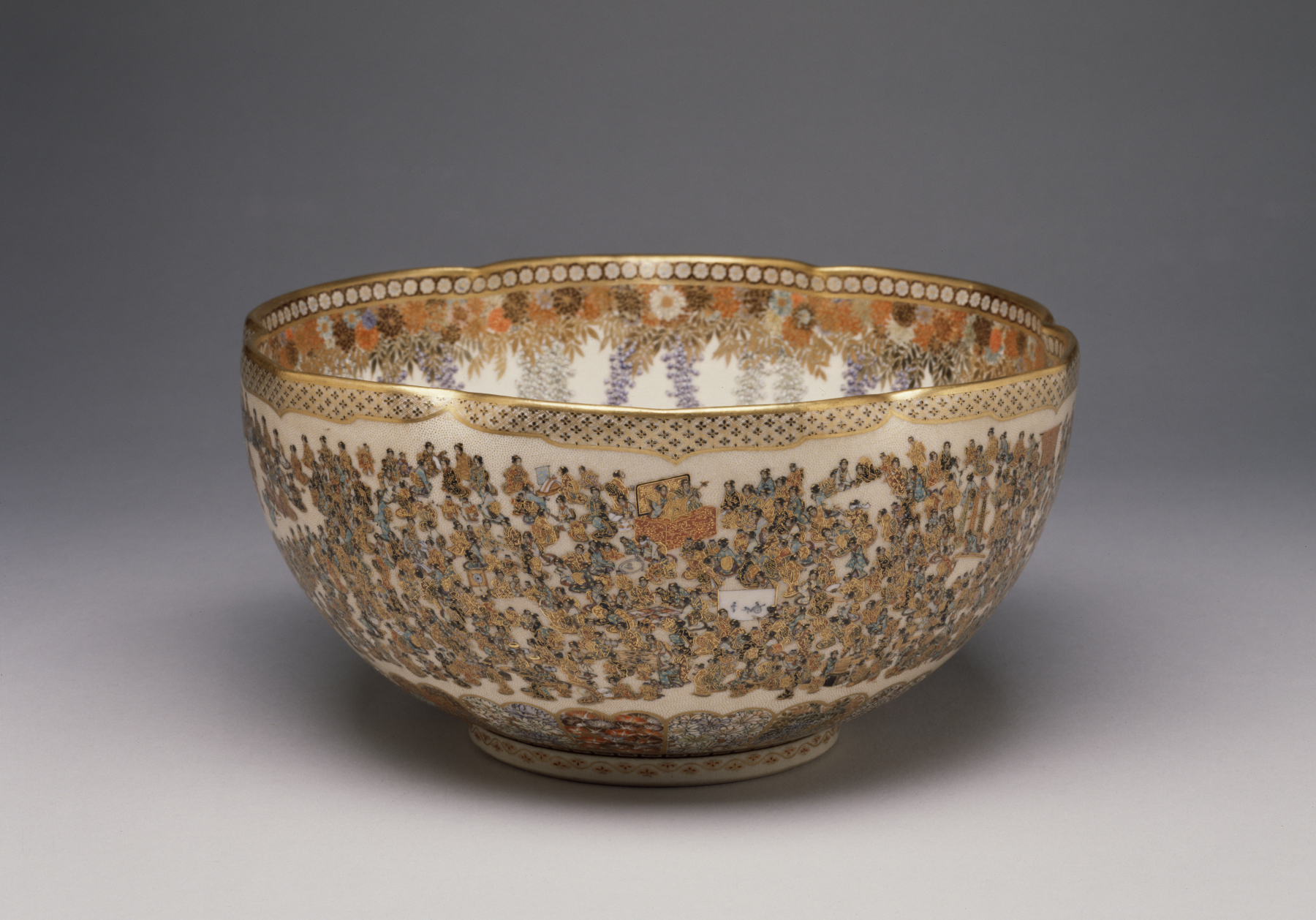
Bowl with a multitude of women, Meiji era, c. 1904, Kinkōzan workshop, by Yabu Meizan

== Criticism ==
The response of critics and collectors to mass-produced Satsuma ware was and is overwhelmingly negative. According to art historian Gisela Jahn, "in no other style of ceramics did the Japanese go to such extremes in attempting to appeal to Western tastes, and nowhere else were the detrimental effects of mass production more clearly evident". In an effort to produce inexpensive, popular items, Satsuma ware designs became "over-crowded", "garish", and "glitzy". There was never a domestic demand for these pieces, which were generally viewed as the "betrayal of Japanese tradition". Serious foreign collectors also turned their backs on export works as "crude, chalky pâte, covered with coarsely fissured glaze, in which more often than otherwise an excess of feldspar has produced discoloured deposits that suggest the reverse of technical skill."

== Types ==
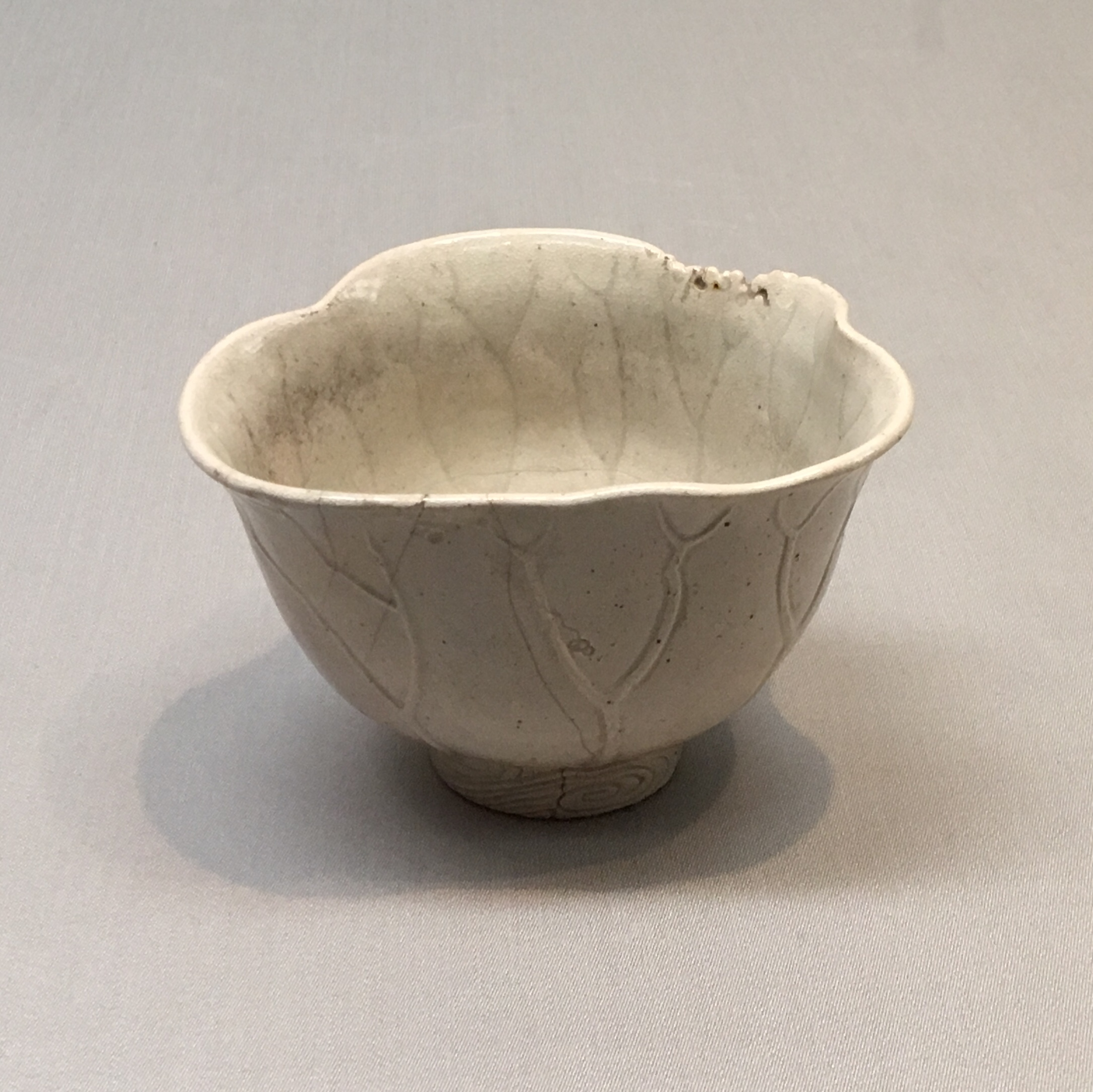
White glaze Satsuma tea bowl in shape of lotus leaf, Edo period, 17th century

In addition to the nishikide and export ware types, there are various categories of Satsuma ware, each with their own distinct aesthetic.

- Shiro Satsuma: white-glazed; originally only for use within daimyō's household
- Kuro Satsuma: black-bodied with dark overglaze
- Jakatsu: blue, yellow and black glazes run together with white overglaze
- Sunkoroku Satsuma: older pieces modeled on the Sawankhalok ceramics of thirteenth-century Thailand, decorated with brown geometrical designs
- Mishima Satsuma: clay with light bluish-grey glaze, with inlaid or impressed geometric patterning filled with white slip overglaze
- Blue-and-white Satsuma: produced in the first decade of the nineteenth century; large pieces with Chinese-inspired designs, often landscapes
- Gosu blue Satsuma: produced in limited quantity in Kyoto in the mid-nineteenth century; pieces with over- or under-glaze containing minerals such as cobalt or asbolite, which gives a bluish hue and a more vivid quality to painted images

== Artists ==
Not all producers of late nineteenth and early twentieth century Satsuma ware sacrificed quality to pander to the export boom. Some prominent artists of the Meiji and Taishō periods include:

- Chin Jukan XII [沈寿官] (1835–1906)
- Tõgō Jukatsu [東郷寿勝] (1855–1936)
- Taizan Yohei IX [帯山与兵衛 (9代)] (1856–1922)
- Itō Tōzan [伊東陶山] (1846–1920)
- Kinkōzan Sōbei VI [錦光山宗兵衛 (6代)] (1824–1884), Kinkōzan Sōbei VII [錦光山宗兵衛 (7代)] (1867–1927)
- Yabu Meizan [藪明山] (1853–1934)
- Miyagawa Kōzan (Makuzu) [宮川香山] (1842–1916)
- Seikozan [精巧山]
- Ryozan [亮山]

Most of these artists set up etsuke workshops around 1880, coinciding with the export slump. Although they did export, stylistically their pieces demonstrated a wish to return to tradition. Their works are recognized for a "restrained style" and "sparing distribution of motifs." Painted themes were often taken from literary classics, heroic legends, or represented nostalgic renderings of life in pre-Meiji Kyoto. Early in the twentieth century these artists also began to incorporate western techniques and styles, including perspective and muted colours, as well as the use of liquid gold (水金, suikin), which was originally developed by Germany's Meissen.

== Marks ==
While older Japanese ceramics often do not feature any stamps or signatures, items made after 1870 in particular, can bear a variety of marks in addition to that of the artist.

=== Shimazu crest ===
Many pieces of Satsuma ware—regardless of age or authenticity—feature the kamon (family crest) of Satsuma's ruling Shimazu clan: a red cross within a red circle. It is placed above any signatures or stamps. While it was originally an indication of a link to the Satsuma domain and the Shimazu clan's direct involvement in the items' production, in the age of mass production and export, the crest simply became a marketing convention. All genuine examples are hand-painted rather than stamped or machine-printed, though hand-painting is not a guarantee of legitimacy.

=== Satsuma ===
"Satsuma" or "satsuma yaki" is sometimes painted or stamped on pieces below the Shimazu crest. It can be written in kanji characters, hiragana, or with the Latin alphabet.

=== Dai Nippon ===
The "Dai Nippon" (大日本 'Great Japan') mark was applied to items during the Meiji period (1868–1912) as an indication of their place of origin during a period of fomenting nationalism. These characters often appear immediately to the right of the maker's mark.

=== Workshops/studios ===
- Chōshūzan: Kyoto workshop active in late Meiji period specializing in dragon ware
- Fuzan: workshop active in Meiji period
- Gyokumeizan: located in Naeshirogawa from 1875 to 1921, and owned by Togo Jukatsu
- Gyozan: Kyoto studio active in Meiji period
- Kinkōzan: pottery active 1645–1927, headed by Kinkōzan Sōbei; exported heavily from 1875, especially to America; largest overall producer of Satsuma export ware
- Koshida: factory active c. 1880–1927; resumed production after 1945
- Maruni: Kobe manufacturer active until 1938
- Taizan/Obi-ya: family-run Kyoto kiln active c. 1673–1922; began exporting in 1872, especially to America
- Yasuda: Kyoto-based company formally known as Yasuda Kyoto Tokiji Goshigaisha, active in Meiji period
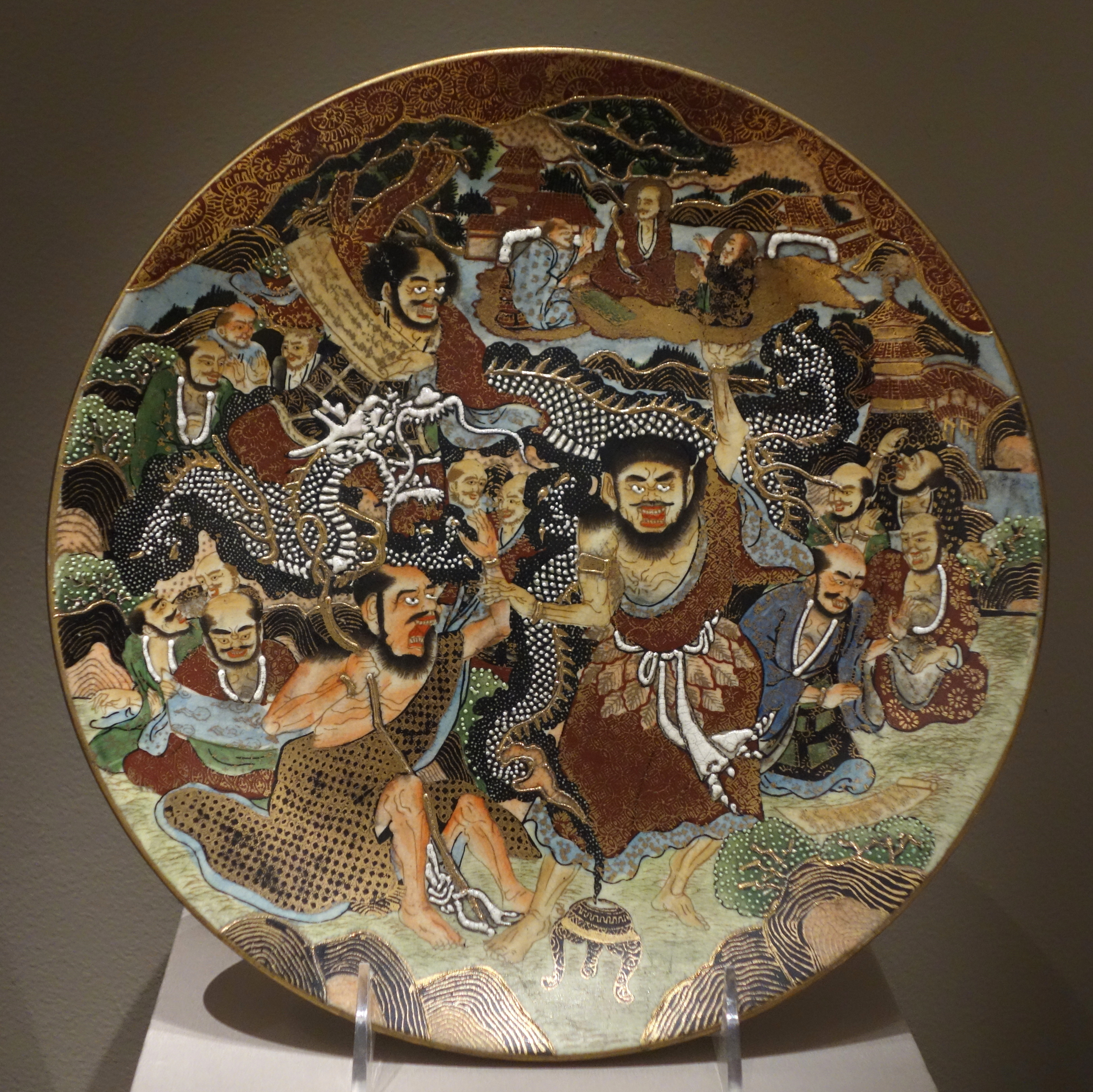
Plate, Chōshūzan workshop, earthenware with overglaze, gold, and white enamel, decorated by Jissei after a design by Yoshisada, undated

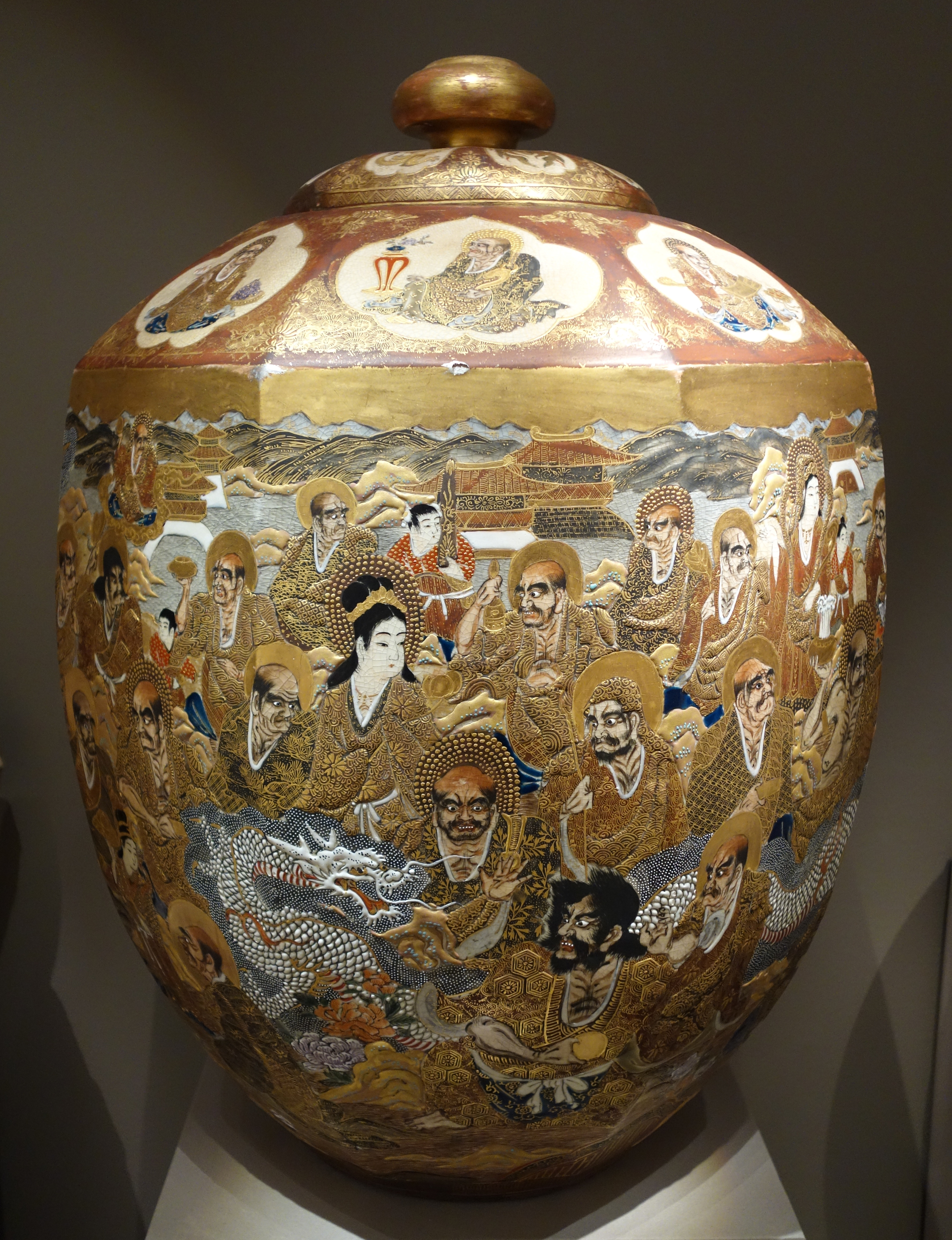
Octagonal covered jar, Hotoda workshop, undated

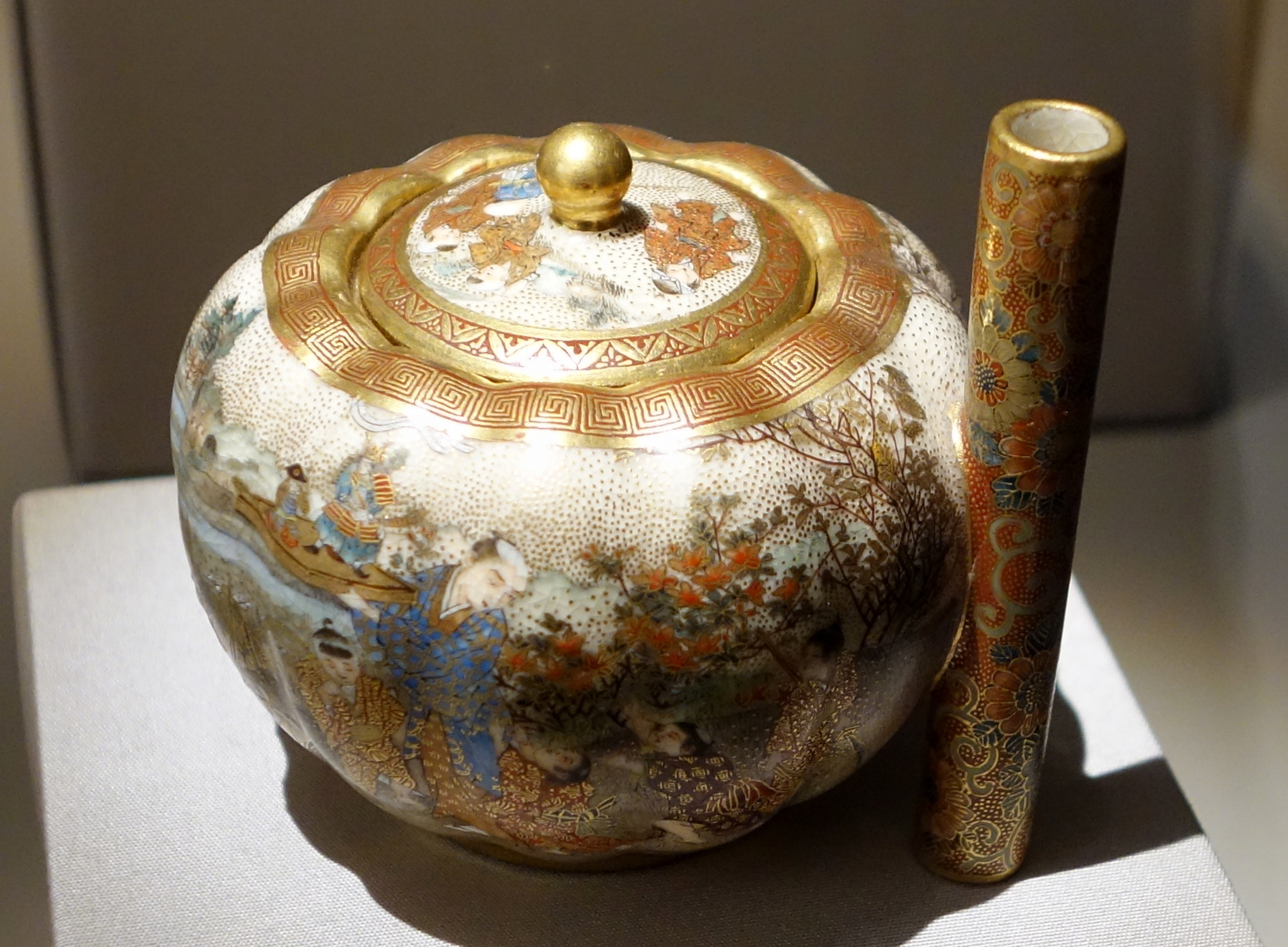
Ribbed lidded incense jar, earthenware with overglaze and gold, Seikozan workshop, undated

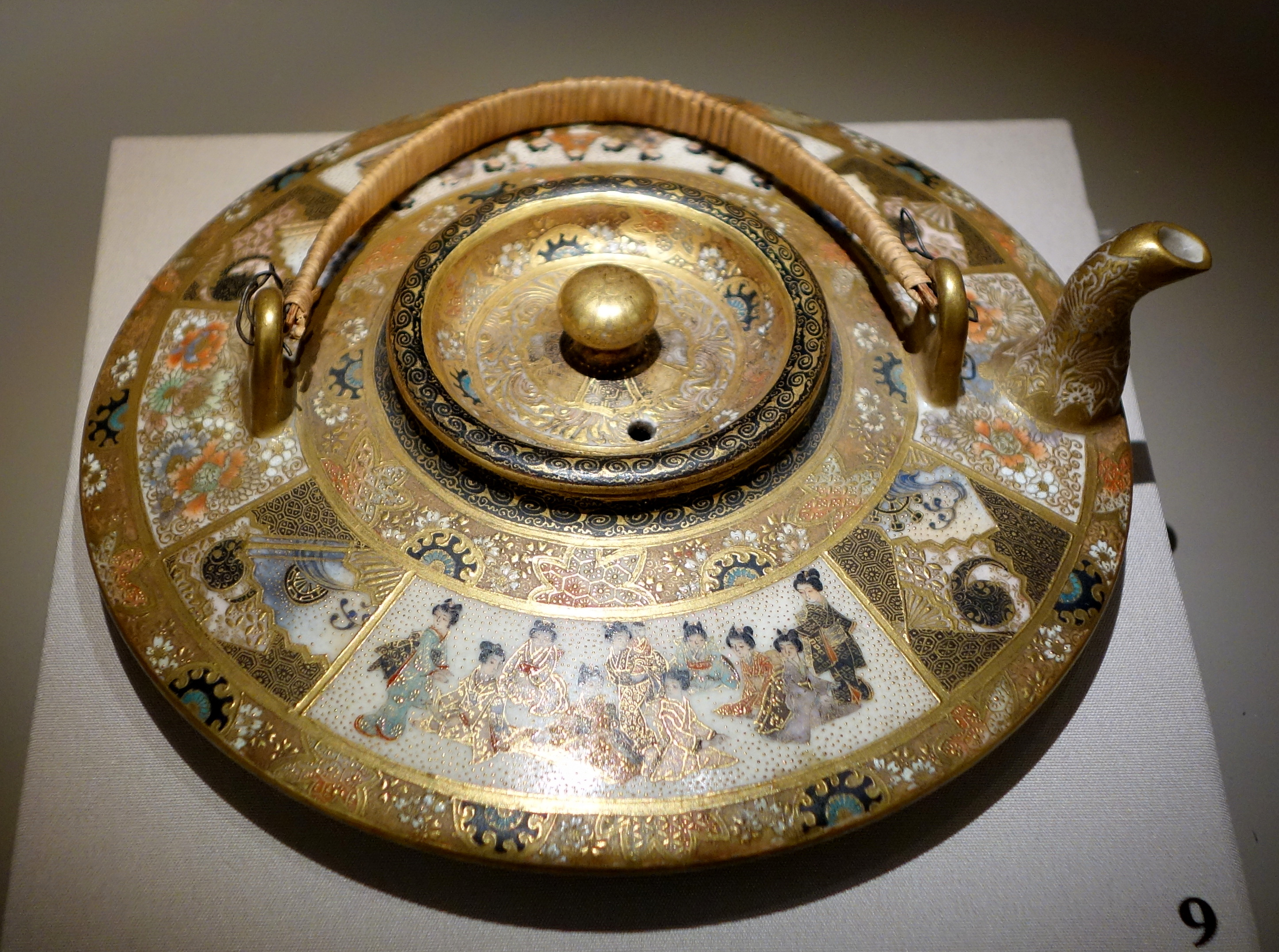
Teapot, earthenware with overglaze and gold, Shutsuzan workshop, undated

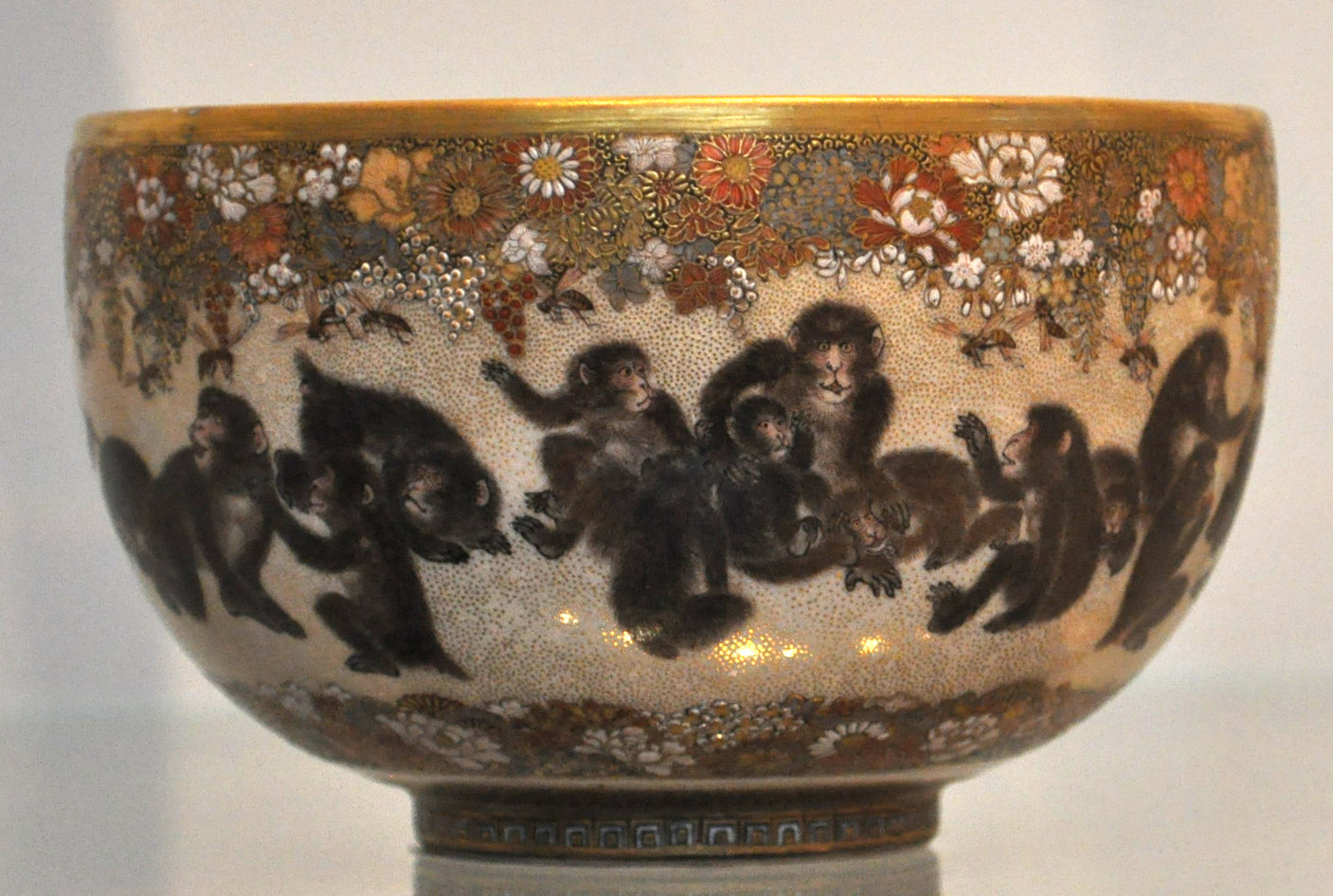
Bowl with monkeys, Shinozuka Kozan, Meiji era

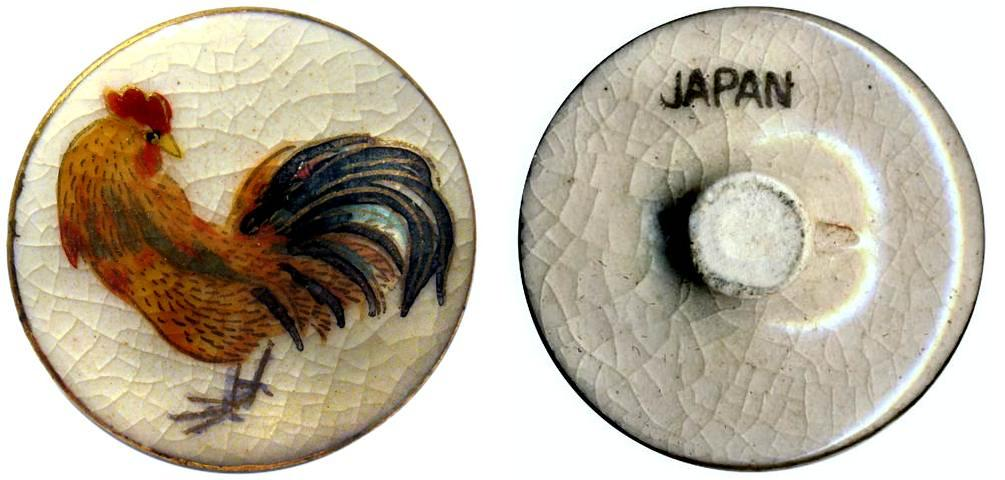
Modern Satsuma ware pictorial button

== Counterfeits ==
The incredible popularity of Satsuma ware and the eagerness of collectors to find pre-Meiji pieces led some manufacturers and dealers to deliberately misrepresent items' age and origins. Some sold other types of ceramics such as Awata or Seto ware as Satsuma. Some falsely used the names of famous artists or studios to mark pieces. Early Japanese ceramics rarely had stamps or signatures, which can make dating some Satsuma ware difficult. One characteristic of earlier pieces, however, is a high-quality glaze and finish, as later mass production led to dramatically inferior works. Another telling feature of genuine pieces is that their bodies do not ring when tapped, since they are made from stoneware clay and not porcelain.
