= Nikko Ceramics =

Japanese ceramics company

NIKKO Company
- Native name: ニッコー株式会社
- Type: Public KK
- Traded as: NAG: 5343
- ISIN: JP3669000006
- Industry: Glass & ceramics
- Founded: May 11, 1908; 118 years ago
- Headquarters: Hakusan, Ishikawa 924-8686, Japan
- Area served: Worldwide
- Key people: Akiko Mitani (president)
- Services: Industrial ceramic products; Ceramic tableware and decorative products; Water treatment facilities
- Revenue: JPY 15.98 billion (FY 2025) (US$ 107 million) (FY 2025)
- Net income: JPY 813 million (FY 2025) (US$ 5.4 million) (FY 2025)
- Number of employees: 571 (consolidated, as of March 31, 2026)
- Website: Official website (in Japanese)

Nikko Company (ニッコー株式会社, Nikkō Kabushiki-gaisha) is a Japanese manufacturer of fine ceramics, known for its tableware products.

== History ==
Nikko was founded in 1908 in Kanazawa, Ishikawa by Lord Maeda and local nobles. The Maeda lords especially fostered arts and crafts, and made of Kanazawa a cultural center like Tokyo and Kyoto. The firm was famous for their ironstone ceramics, but Nikko has broadened its output since the 1970s.

Western materials such as bone china were introduced and developed using Nikko’s own technologies. Today all aspects of production from glaze formulation to mould making are manufactured in-house by Nikko’s team of craftspeople.

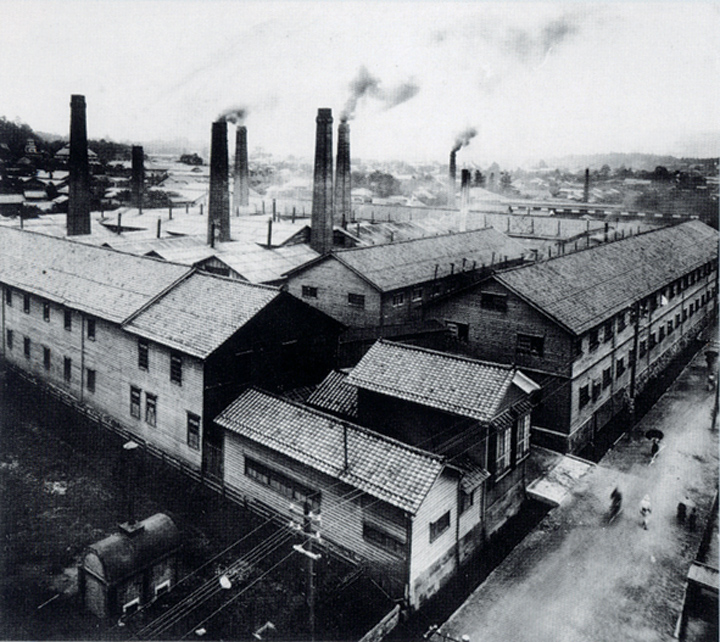
The Nikko porcelain factory in Kanazawa, Ishikawa Prefecture.

== Products ==
Nikko tableware collections include the Sensu, Blossom and Macaroon ranges, as well as the Blossom Lighting design.
