= Arita ware =

Type of Japanese porcelain ware

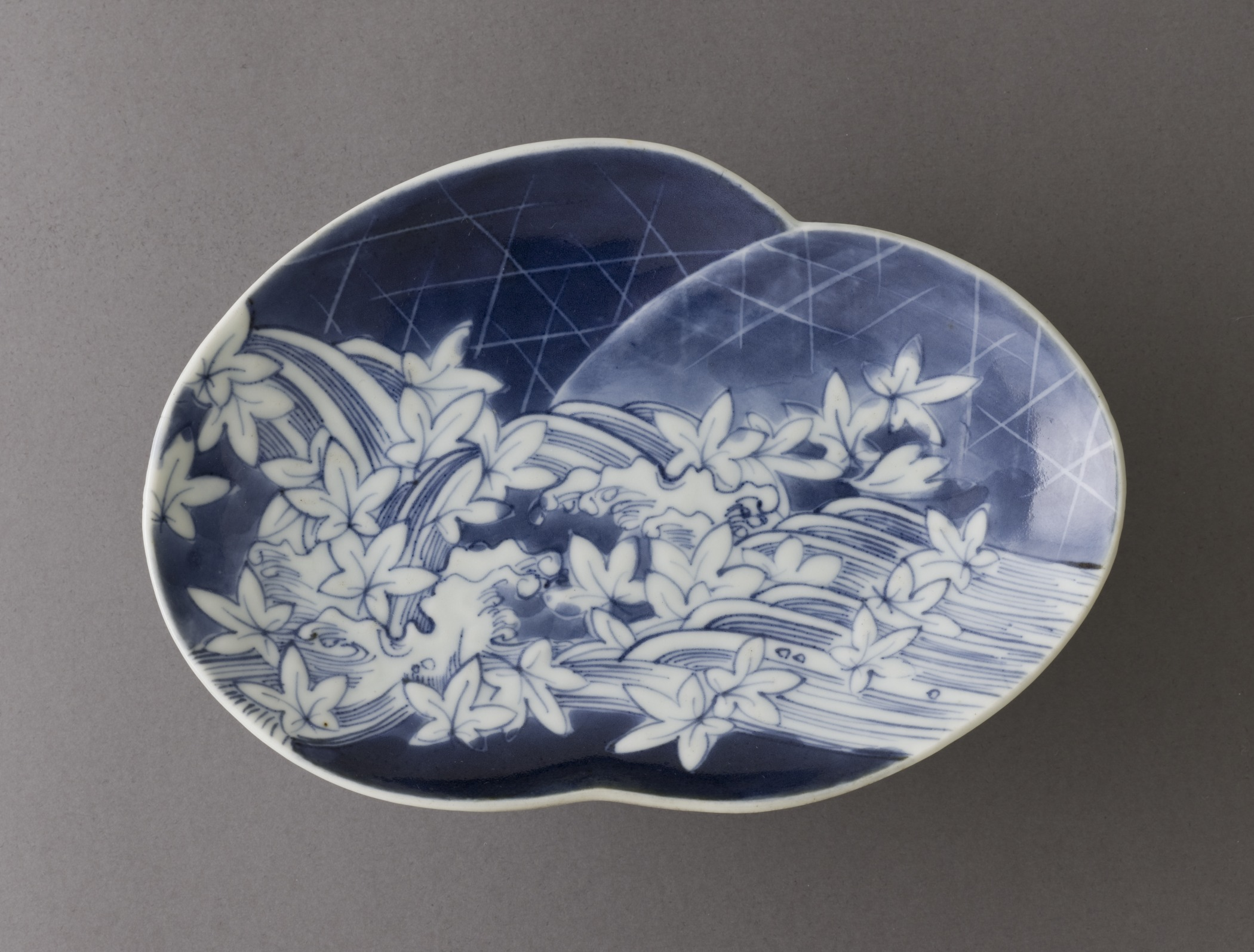
Arita porcelain dish with underglaze blue, with design of river, weirs, and maple leaves, c. 1650–1670s

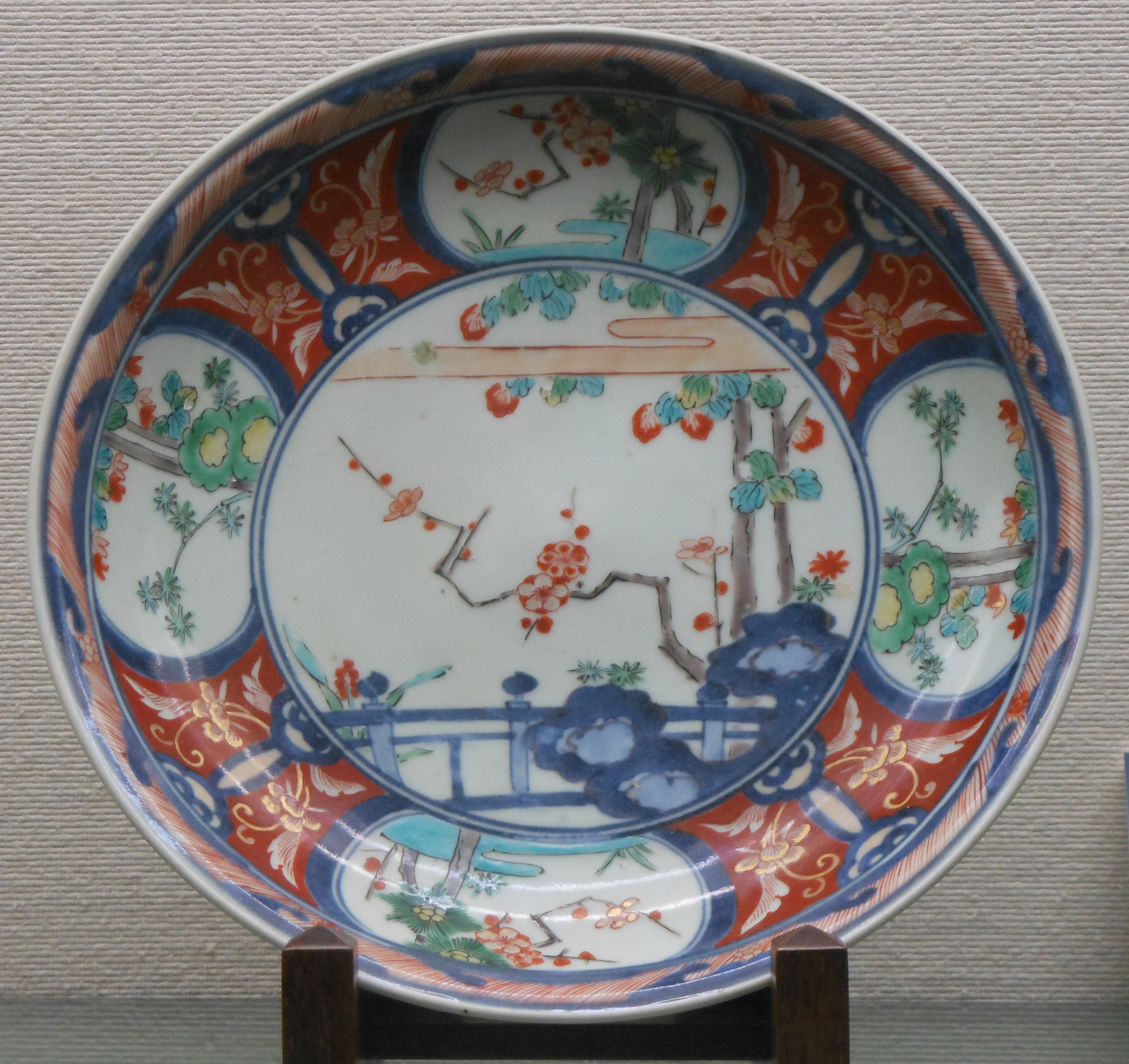
Arita Sarayama dish with overglaze polychrome enamel design of plum and fence, 1700–1730s

Arita ware (Japanese: 有田焼, Hepburn: Arita-yaki) is a broad term for Japanese porcelain made in the area around the town of Arita, in the former Hizen Province, northwestern Kyūshū island. It is also known as Hizen ware (肥前焼, Hizen-yaki) after the wider area of the province. This was the area where the great majority of early Japanese porcelain, especially Japanese export porcelain, was made.

In English usage "Arita ware" was traditionally used for the export wares in blue and white porcelain, mostly copying Chinese styles. The wares with added overglaze colours were called Imari ware or (a sub-group) Kakiemon. It is now recognized that the same kilns often made more than one of these types, and "Arita ware" is more often used as a term for all of them. The brightly coloured Kutani ware is another type that is now recognised as coming from around Arita as well as the Kutani itself, and "Kutani-type" is used as a stylistic description.

== History ==
According to tradition, the Korean potter Yi Sam-pyeong (d. 1655), or Kanagae Sanbee (金ヶ江三兵衛), is often considered the father of Arita ware porcelain. This narrative is however disputed by many historians. He is nevertheless honoured in Sueyama Shrine as the founder.

The first porcelain made in Japan followed the discovery of porcelain clay near Arita near the end of the 16th century. A number of kilns opened up in the area, and a considerable variety of styles were made, the Japanese export porcelain destined for Europe often using Western shapes and Chinese decoration. Early wares used underglaze blue decoration, but by the mid-17th century Arita was in the forefront as Japan developed overglaze "enamelled" decoration in a range of bright colours.

Between the second half of the 17th century and the first half of the 18th century they were extensively exported to Europe, travelling initially from Arita's port of Imari, Saga to the Dutch East India Company's outpost at Nagasaki. The type called kin-rande was especially popular and is therefore known in the West also as Imari ware (伊万里焼, Imari-yaki). This typically is decorated in underglaze blue, then with red, gold, black for outlines, and sometimes other colours, added in overglaze. In the most characteristic floral designs most of the surface is coloured, with "a tendency to overdecoration that leads to fussiness". The style was so successful that Chinese and European producers began to copy it.

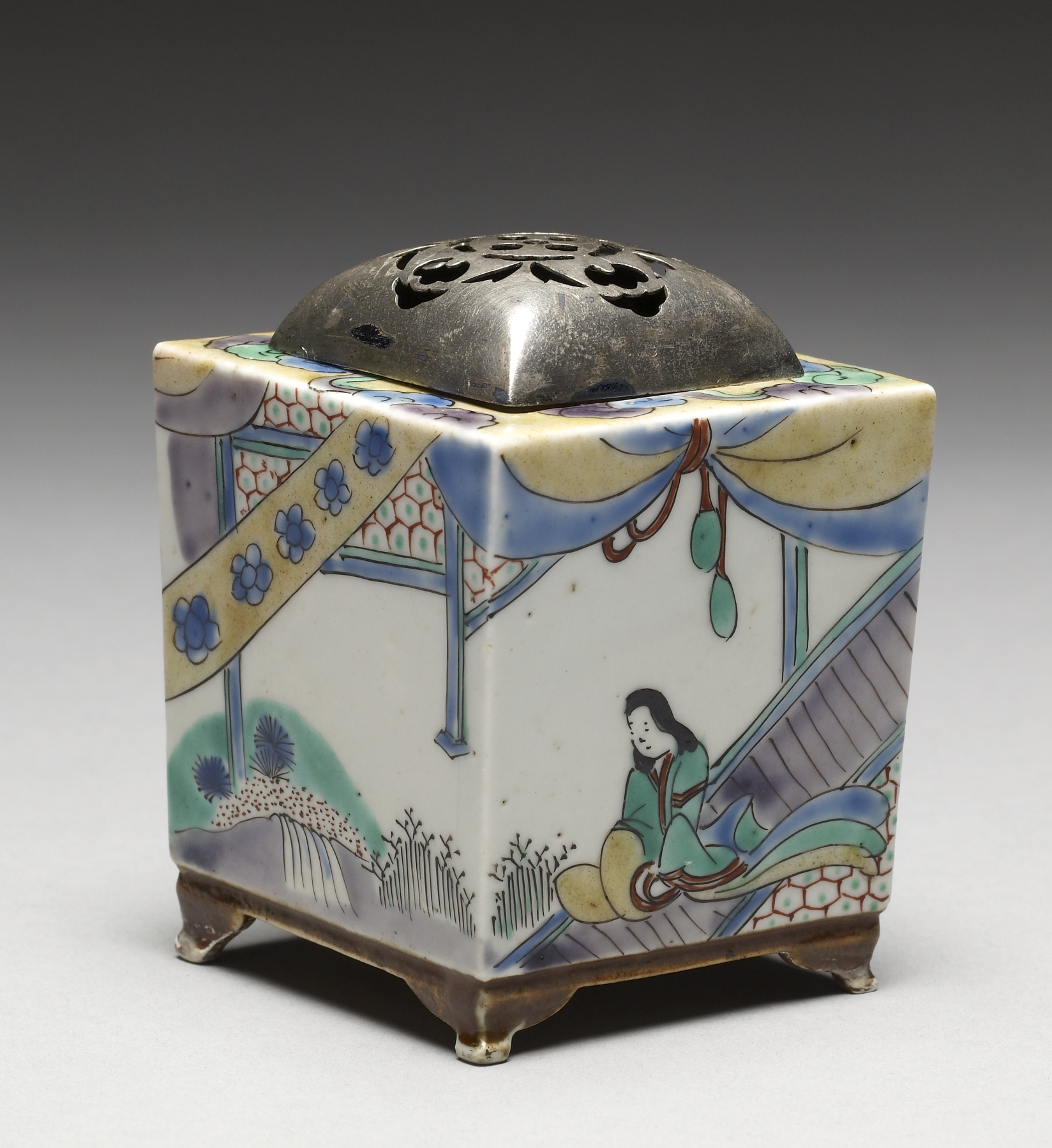
Arita ware incense burner (kōro) with domestic scenes, late Edo period/early Meiji era, 19th century

Nabeshima ware was an Arita product, with overglaze decoration of a very high quality, produced for the Nabeshima Lords of the Saga Domain from the late 17th century into the 19th, with the first half of the 18th century considered the finest period. It was never exported at the time. Kakiemon is a term that generates further confusion, being the name of a family, one or more kilns, and a brightly-coloured overglaze style broadly imitating Chinese wares. The style originated with the family, whose kilns were the main producers of it, but other kilns also made it, and the Kakiemon kilns made other styles. It was also widely imitated in Europe, and sometimes in China.

Evidence from modern excavation of kiln-sites shows that much of the Kutani ware, supposedly from Honshu island, was in fact made around Arita. This was largely made for export to southeast Asian markets. The kilns in Arita also produced plain white Hakuji porcelain, often imitating the Chinese equivalent Dehua porcelain.

One of the patterns used is Karako (唐子) with the depiction of Chinese children playing.

== Contemporary Arita ware ceramists ==
Yuki Hayama
