= Karako =

Term used with depiction of Chinese children playing

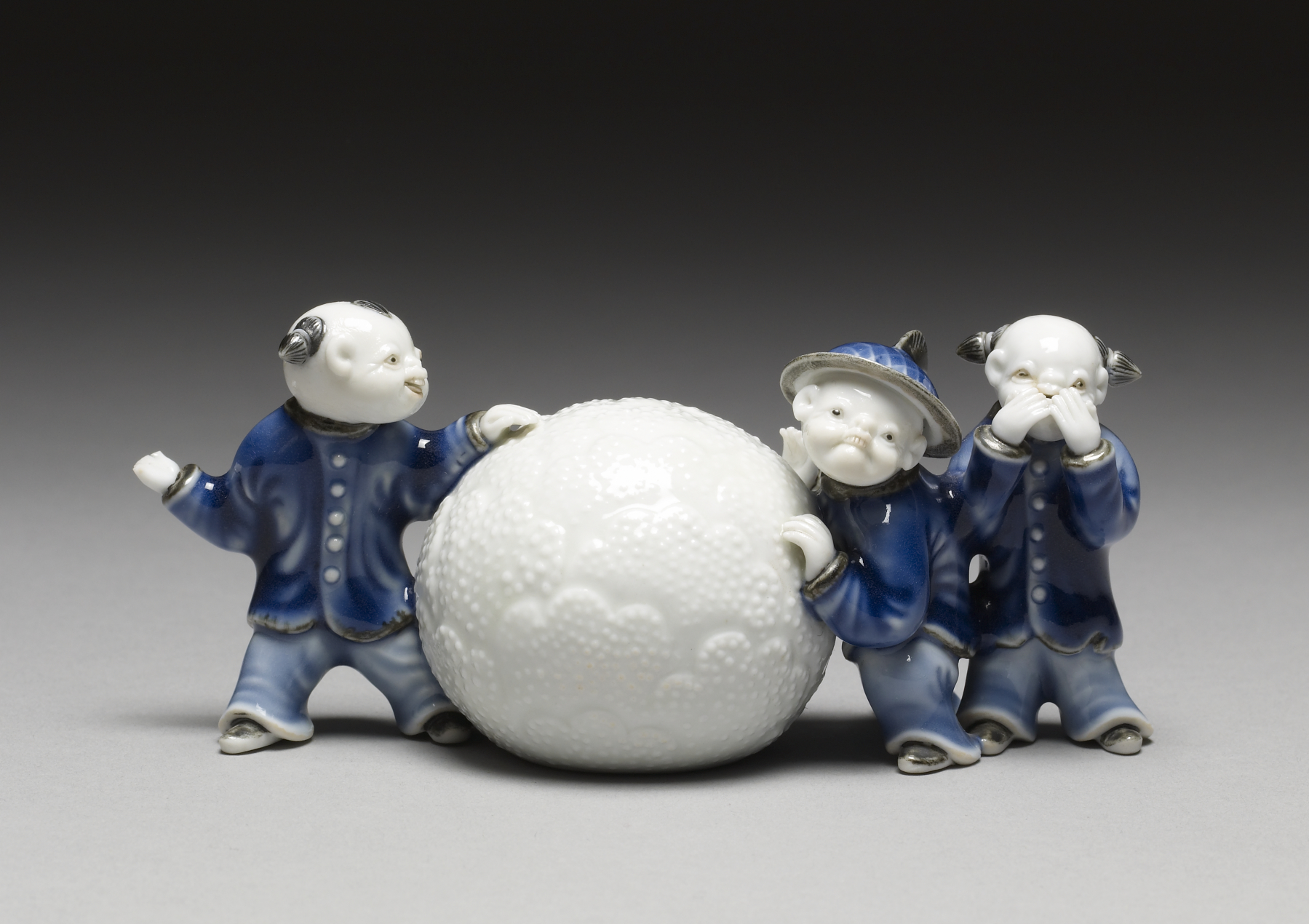
Hirado ware brush rest depicting three karako Chinese boys in the process of rolling a snowball

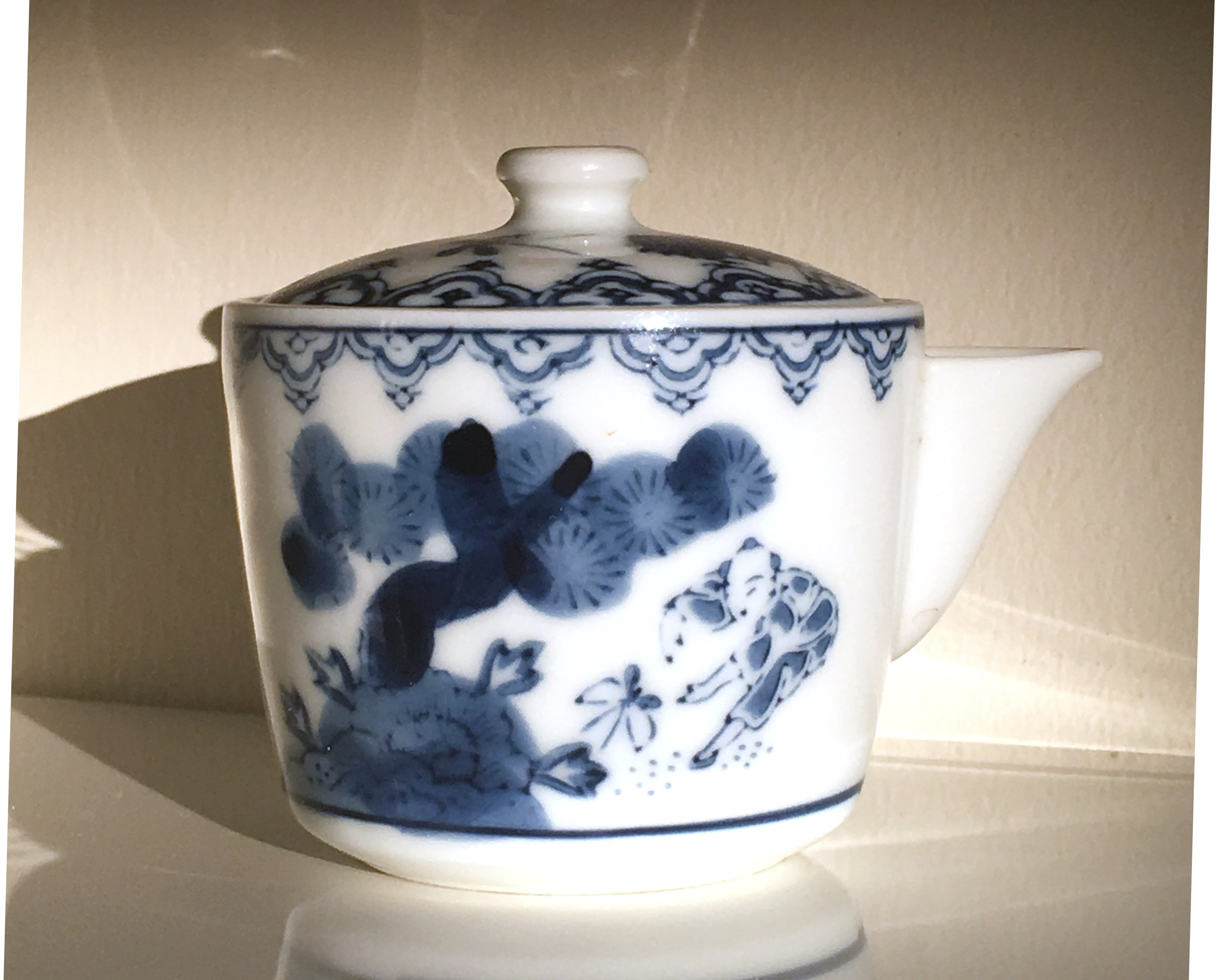
Sencha kyūsu Arita ware sometsuke with glazed karako motifs

Karako (唐子) is a Japanese term used in art with the depiction of Chinese children playing. The literal translation means "Tang children". The children tend to be depicted with a particular hairstyle that is knotted at the top and shaved on both sides of the head.

The theme of these playing children can be found in screens and ceramics and other forms of Japanese art. They symbolise the innocence and joy of childhood. Arita ware, Nabeshima ware, and Hirado ware are typical examples of Japanese pottery that depict karako. In painted form on ceramic ware, it often shows boys chasing butterflies.

== See also ==
- Japanese tea utensils
