= Hirado ware =

Type of Japanese porcelain ware

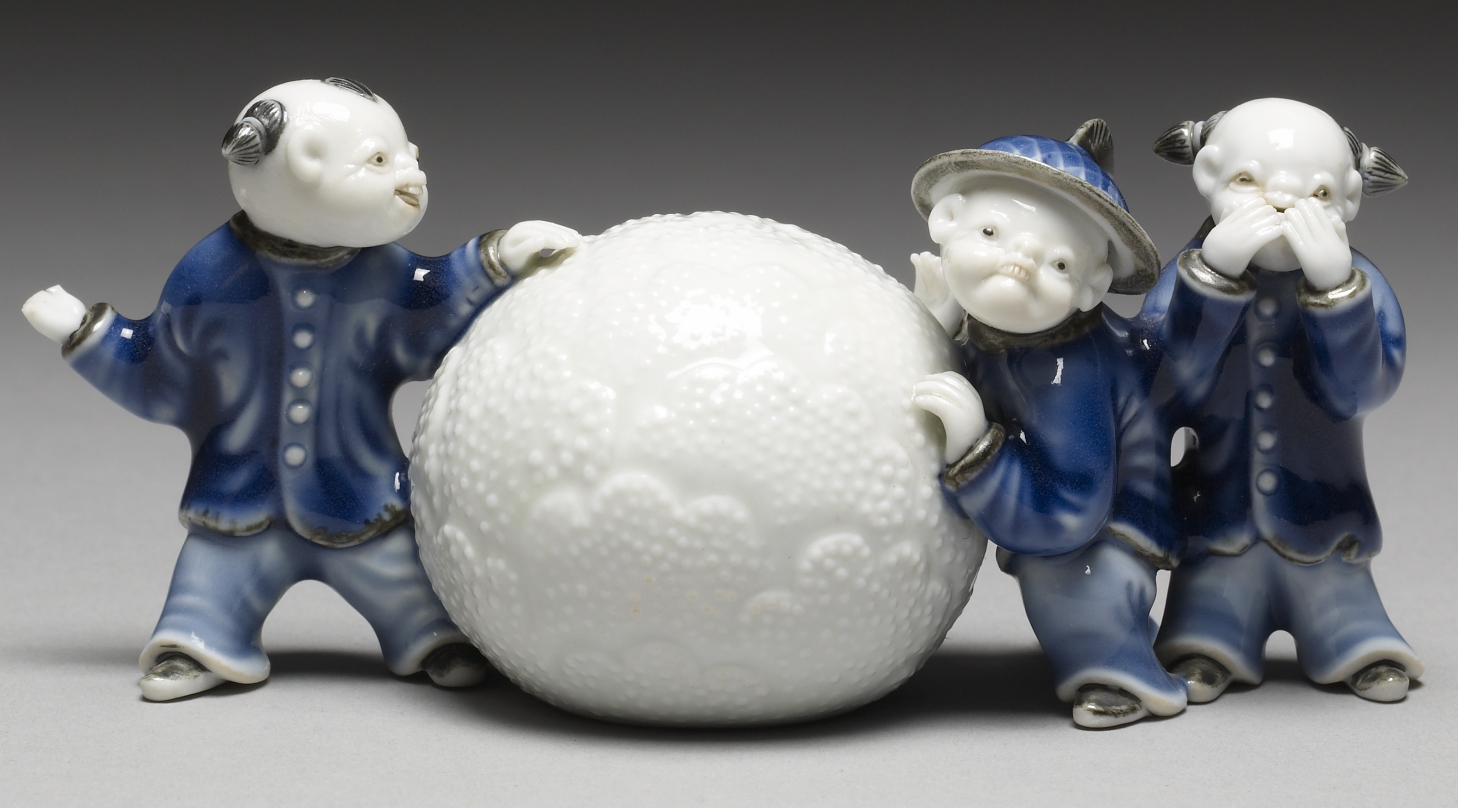
Brush rest in the form of karako boys with a snowball, porcelain with underglaze blue, 1800–1830

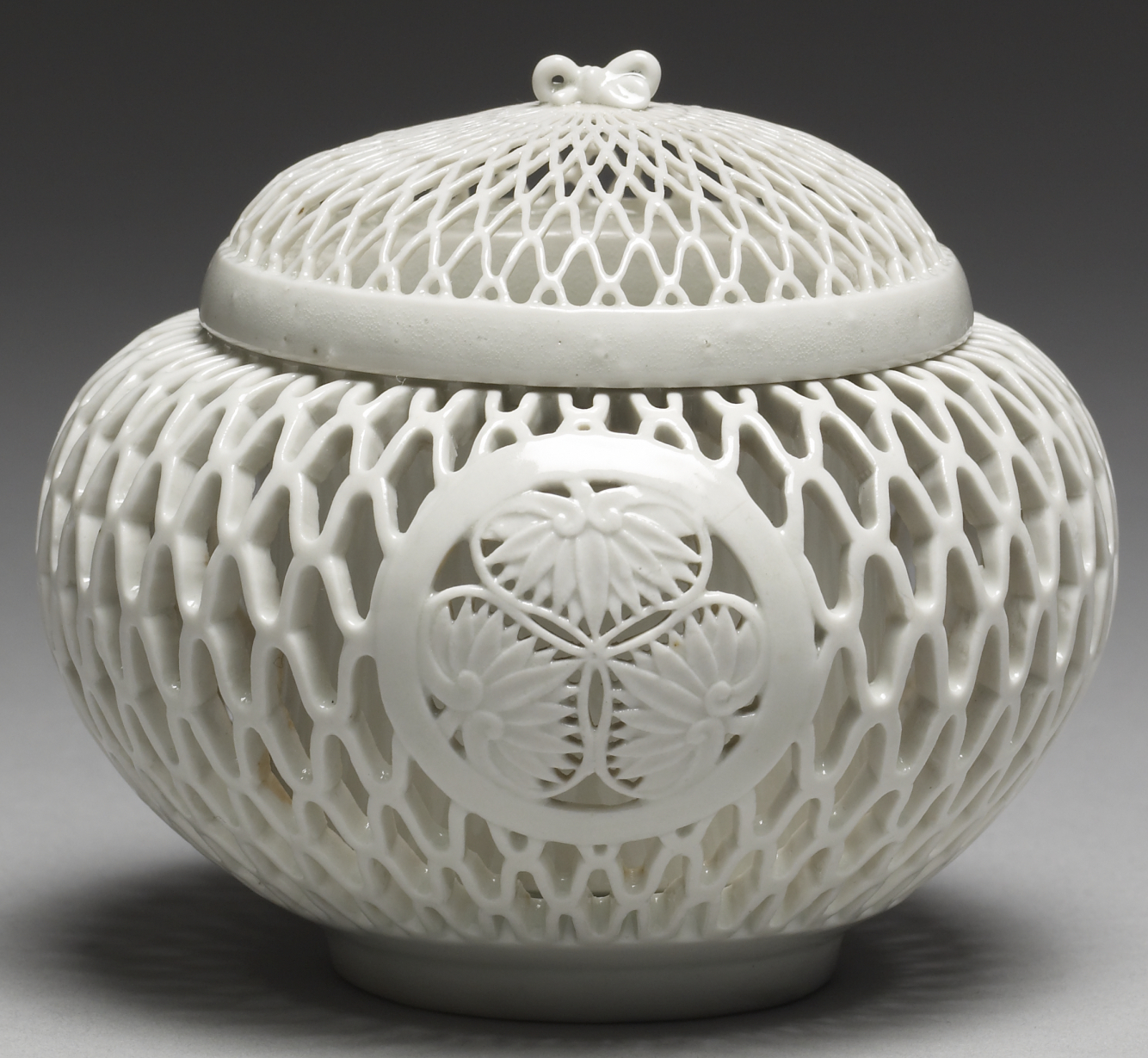
Hirado ware openwork incense burner (koro) with the shōgun's Tokugawa clan crest aoi mon, 1775–1800

Hirado ware (Japanese: 平戸焼, Hepburn: hirado-yaki) is a type of Japanese porcelain mostly made at kilns at Mikawachi, Sasebo, Nagasaki, and it is therefore also known as Mikawachi ware (三川内焼, Mikawachi-yaki). It was made in the former feudal Hirado Domain, which owned the kilns, and was responsible for establishing and directing their production.

It is known mainly for its sometsuke underglaze cobalt blue and white porcelain, with the amount of blue often low, showing off the detailed modelling and the very fine white colour of the porcelain. This has a finer grain than most Japanese porcelains, allowing fine detail and thin and complicated openwork in forms. It was used for tablewares, but was especially noted for small figures and structured objects such as incense burners and brush rests. It developed supplying the domestic Japanese market in the 18th century, in the gap between the two main periods of Japanese export porcelain, and produced much of the best Japanese porcelain of the late 18th century and early 19th century. When large-scale exports resumed, it had a good share in the trade.

== History and characteristics ==
The Hirado daimyō family, the Matsura, established a village of Korean potters in the early 17th century. They made stoneware of the Karatsu ware type. In the next generation, in the mid-1630s, one of these, Sanojō (1610–1694), discovered a good source of kaolin, needed for porcelain, at Mikawachi. In 1637 potters were settled there, and the next year Sanojō was made chief administrator of local production, and by 1650 three potting villages had been combined into a single enterprise, by now making porcelain, though probably not yet exclusively. As with Nabeshima ware, the Matsura lords used the kilns to order "presentation ware" of the highest quality for them to use themselves and give as politically important presents to the shōgun, emperor, and other daimyō families. Sanojō's son, Imamura Ajibe, is recorded as making sets of porcelains for the presentation to the shōgun in 1664, and the emperor in 1699. However, these 17th-century wares are similar to some contemporary Imari ware, with a grayish tint to the porcelain body, and very different from the style that was to make Hirado famous.

A crucial development came in 1712, when a potter from the Hirado villages discovered a better source of kaolin on the Amakusa islands off the coast. This produced the superior white and hard porcelain for which Hirado wares became famous. In the years following this, painters from the Tosa and Kanō schools were brought in, the former for detailed plant subjects and the latter for animal, figure and landscape subjects. They oriented the style of decoration towards a painterly "Japanese design vocabulary". The range of shapes was also greatly expanded, from being mainly vessels for food and drink to include a variety of boxes, equipment for the scholar's desk such as brush rests, and some accessories for clothing such as netsuke.

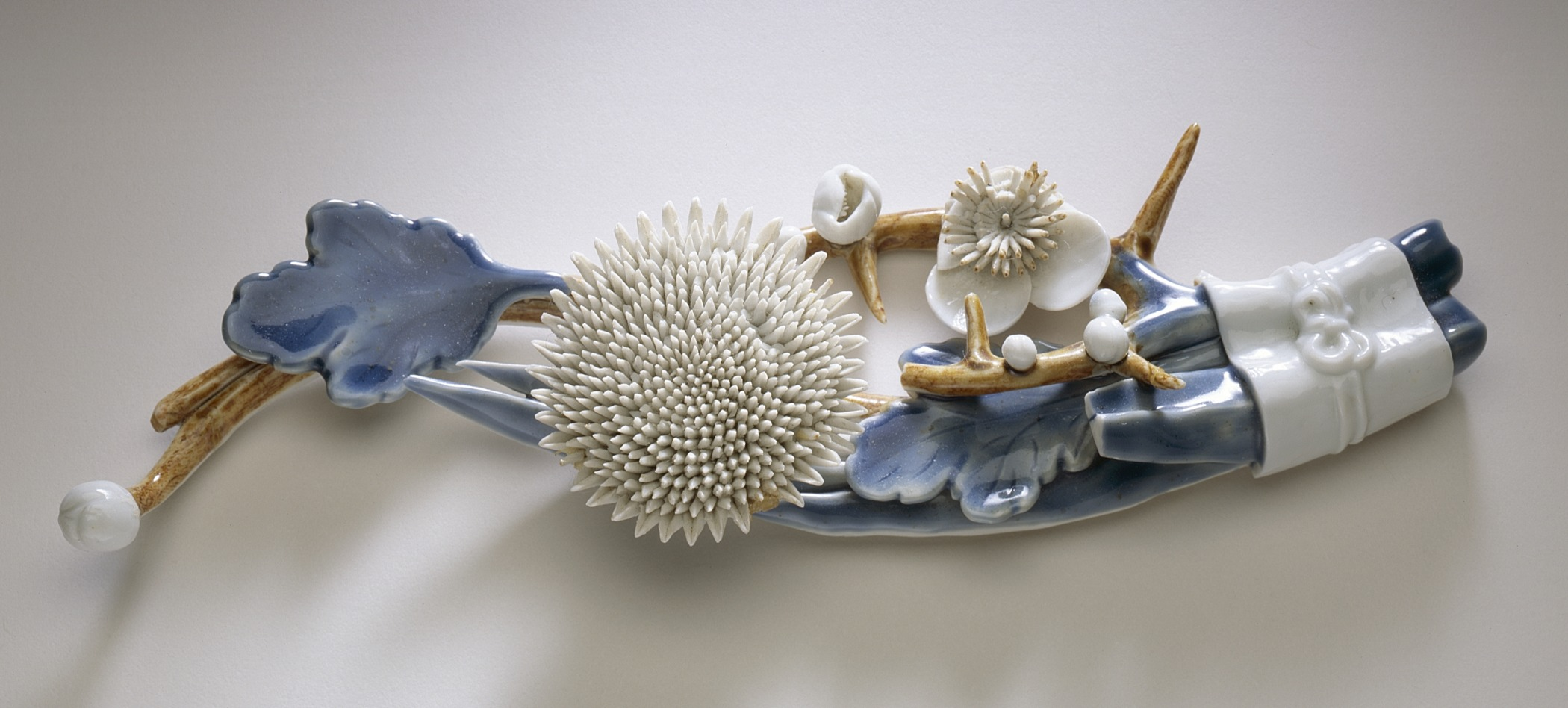
Paperweight with chrysanthemums and plum blossoms, blue and brown underglaze, 19th-century

A motif of "Chinese boys" (karako) chasing butterflies with landscape details in the background became a distinctive feature of Hirado. Initially the number of boys shown was strictly graded, with seven depicted on pieces for presentation to the emperor or shōgun, five for daimyō and high officials, and three for others. Later similar boys appeared modelled as figures. Sculptural vessels with the form of animals began to appear, as well as designs including relief and small okimono figurines that were purely decorative. These trends were in place before the explosive growth in exports following the reopening of Japan in the 1850s, and were to be taken to further extremes in the subsequent period.

Much Hirado ware was vessels for tea-drinking, but mostly for the less formal drinking of sencha rather than the Japanese tea ceremony, where the type of tea bowl (chawan) favoured by the tea-masters were typically more traditional non-porcelain types, that were more characterful to the touch. But Hirado ware was popular for the water jars used to hold the cold water for the tea ceremony. The very fine shaping and finish of Hirado ware was regarded as suitable for the many types of small pieces categorized as belonging to the "scholar's desk", such as brush rests, water droppers, paperweights, and desk screens.

Though underglaze blue on white wares were the main products after the better kaolin was found in 1712, there were always some other types of decoration used, either for details or as the main colouring. These included the use of unglazed biscuit porcelain, an underglaze celadon and other colours, and overglaze enamels. By the 19th century the kilns were also imitating Nabeshima ware, and even Worcester porcelain.

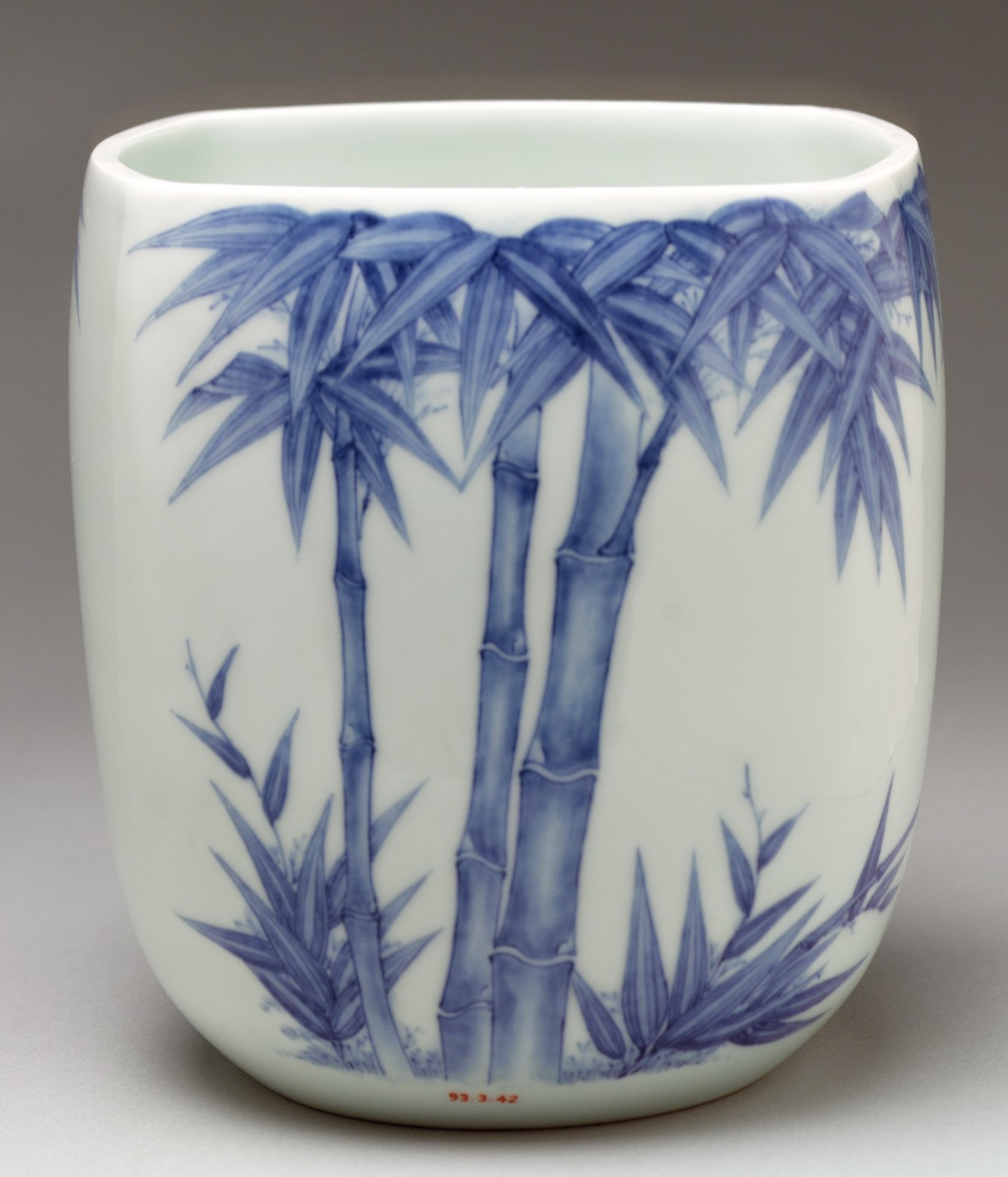
Water jar (for tea ceremony) with bamboo, 1st half 18th century

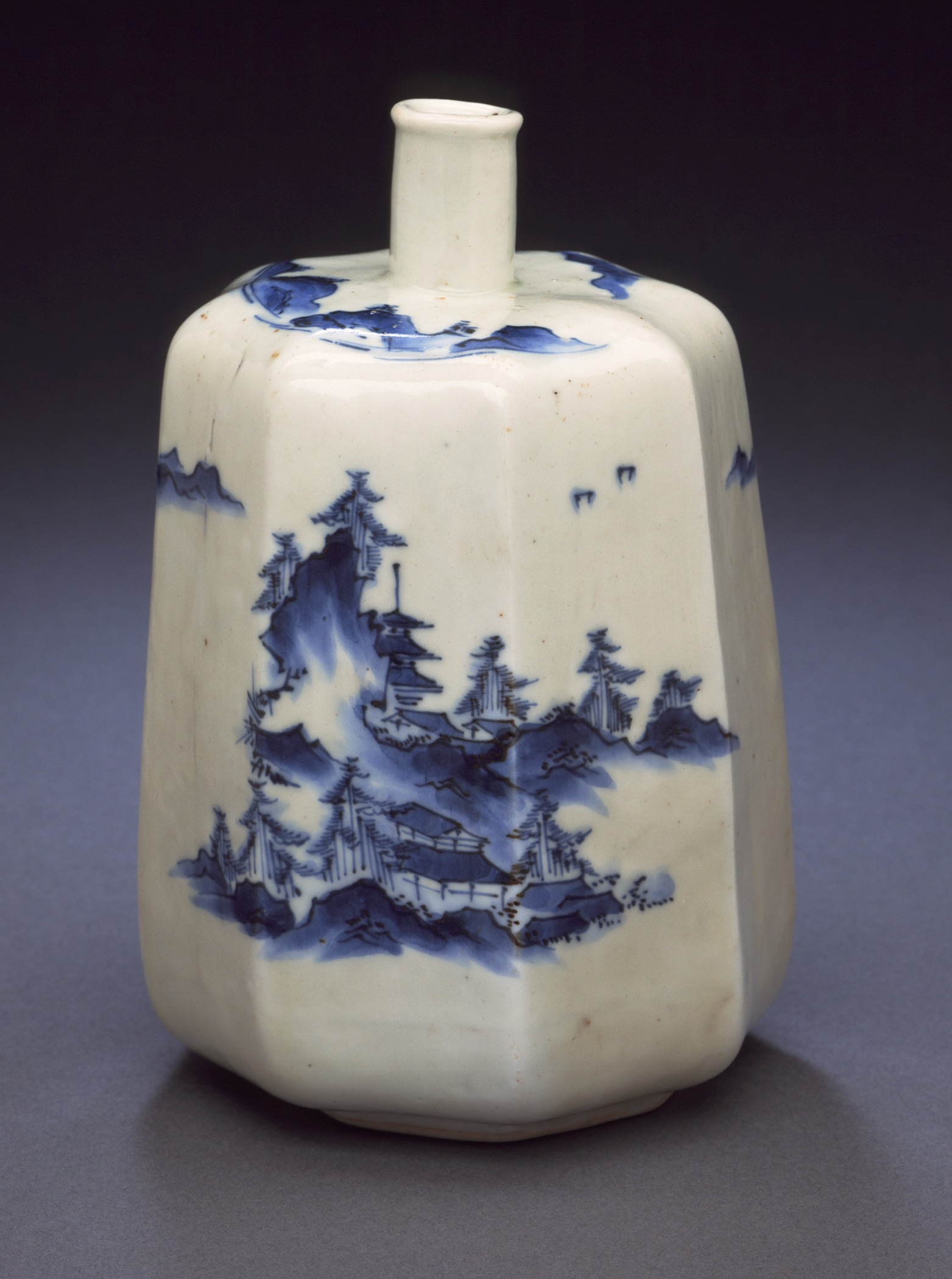
Sake flask (Tokkuri) with landscape, 2nd half 18th century

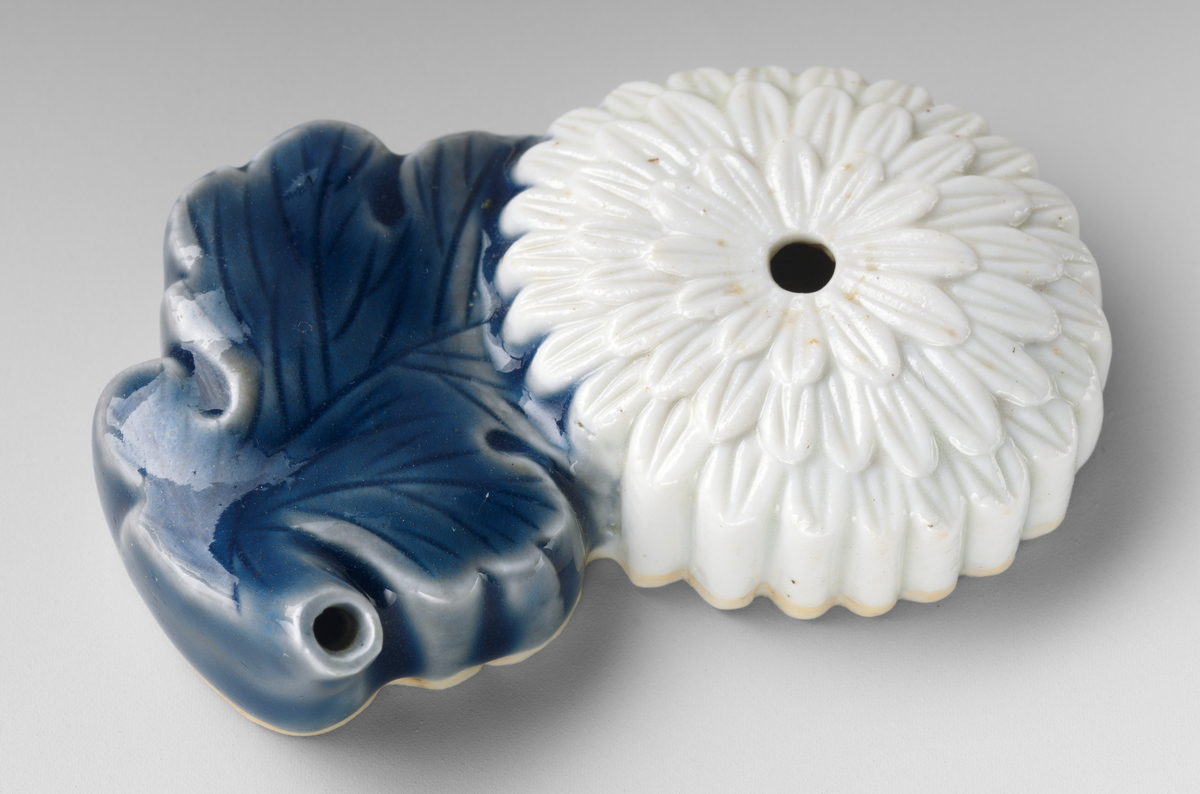
Water dropper in the shape of a chrysanthemum, before 1827

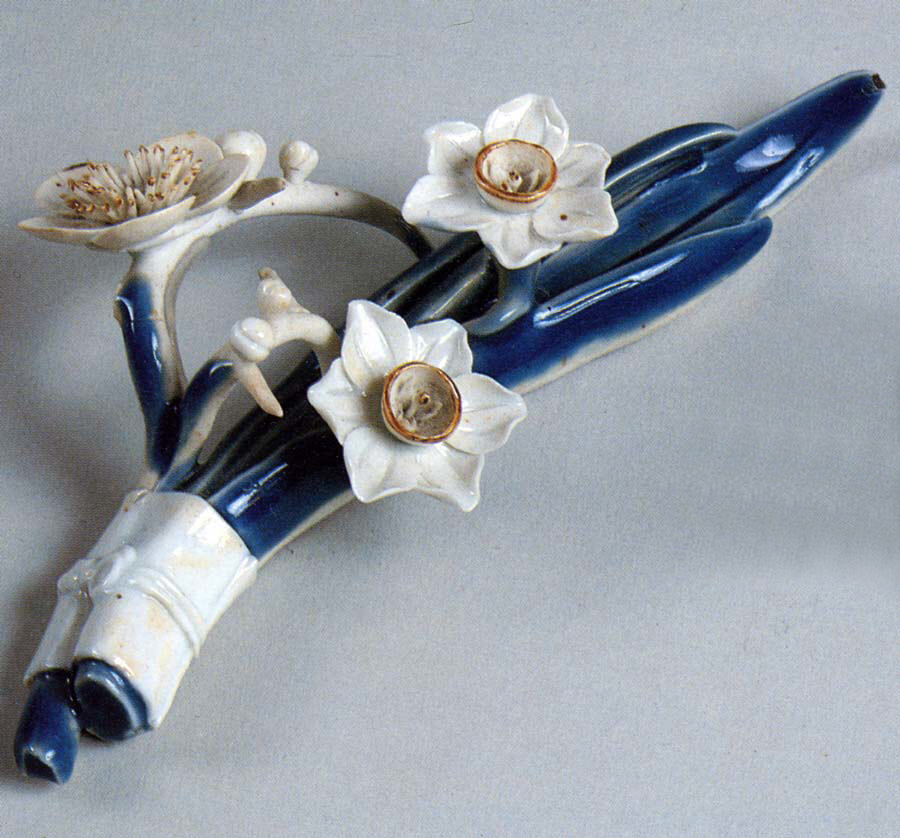
Brush rest in the shape of a narcissus spray, with overglaze enamels, before 1827

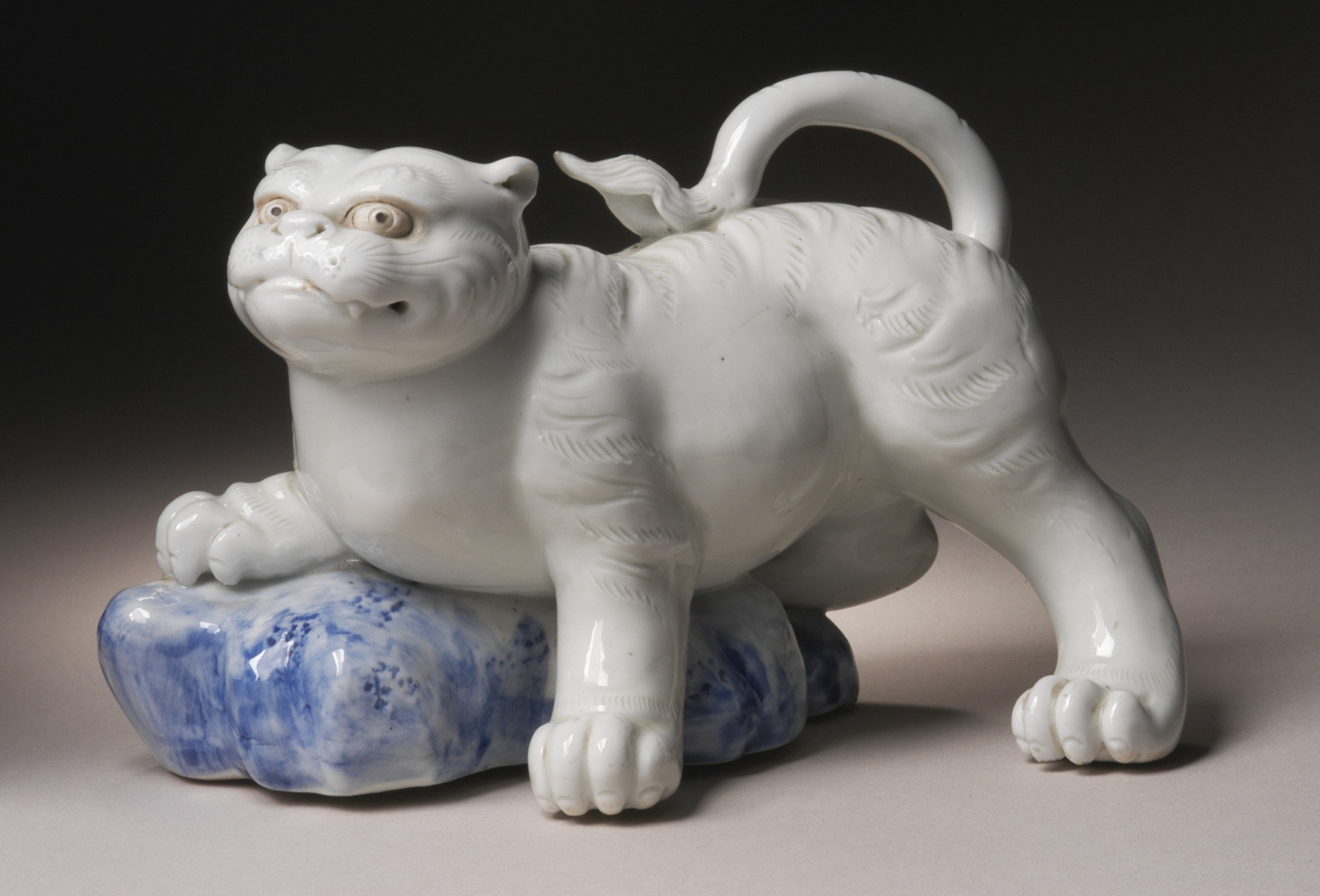
Okimono figurine in the form of a tiger climbing onto a rock, 19th century

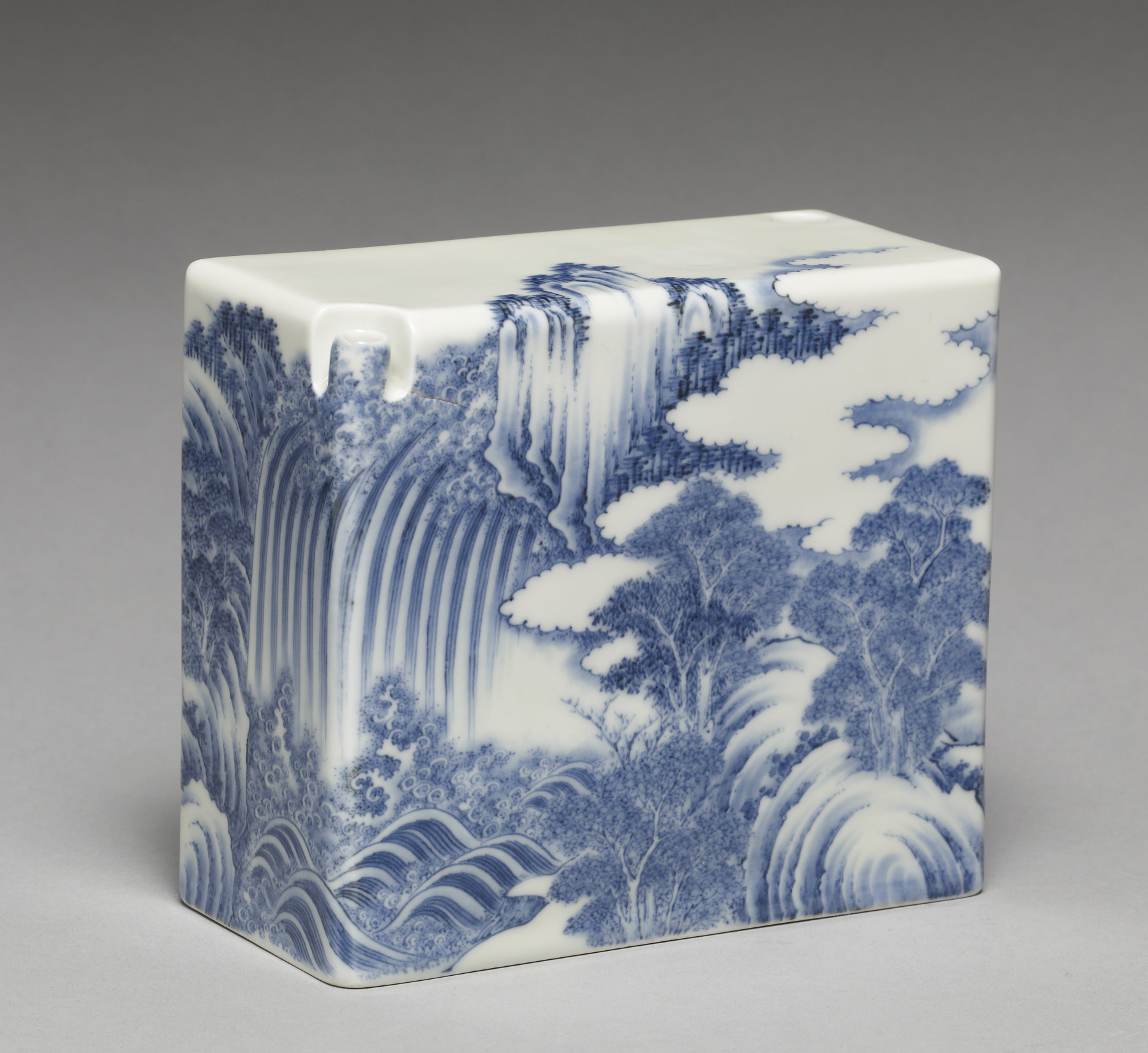
Sake ewer from a portable picnic set, 1830s

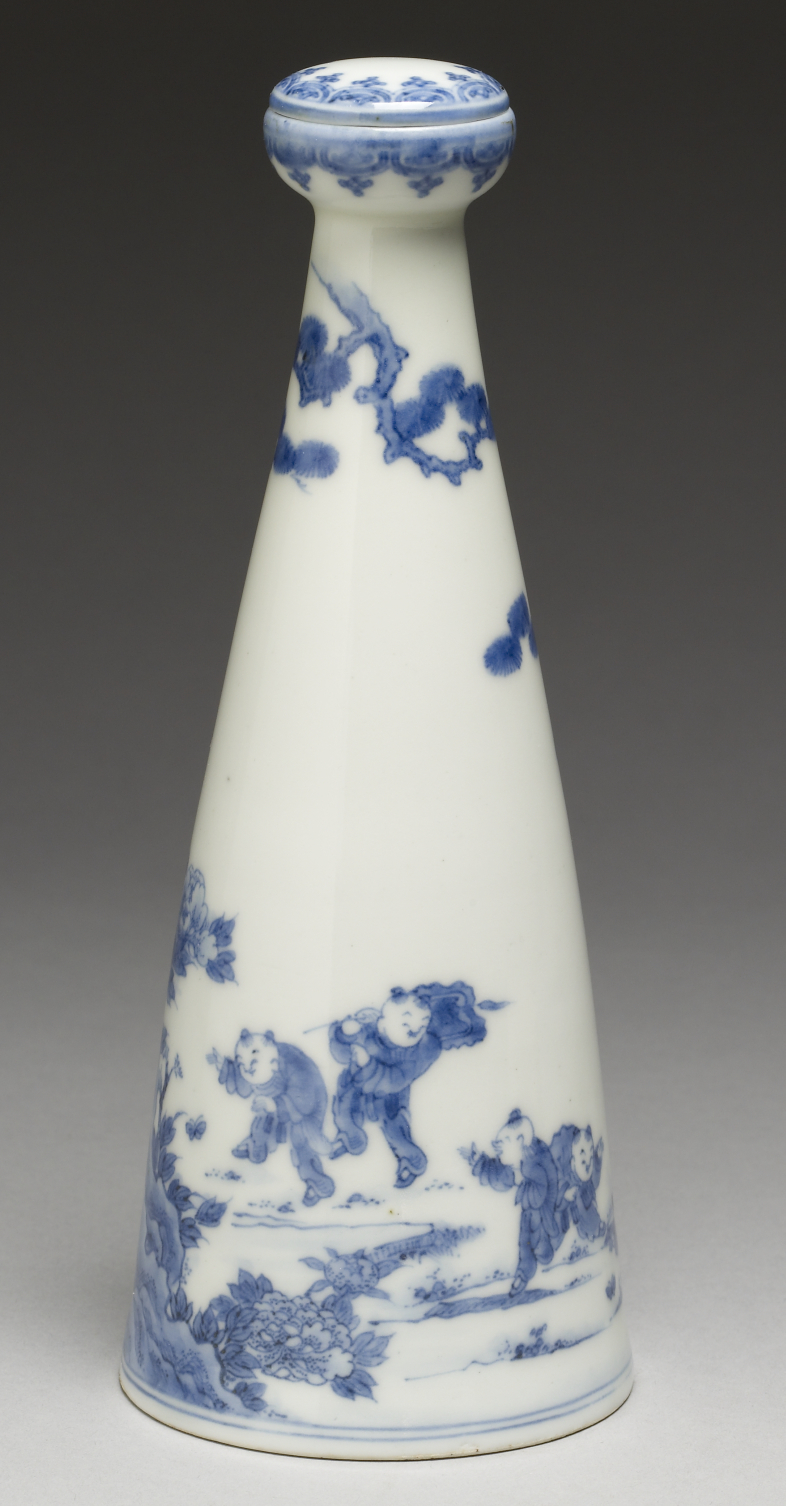
Sake bottle ("Tokkuri") with Boys Chasing Butterflies (seven in total), 1830–1860

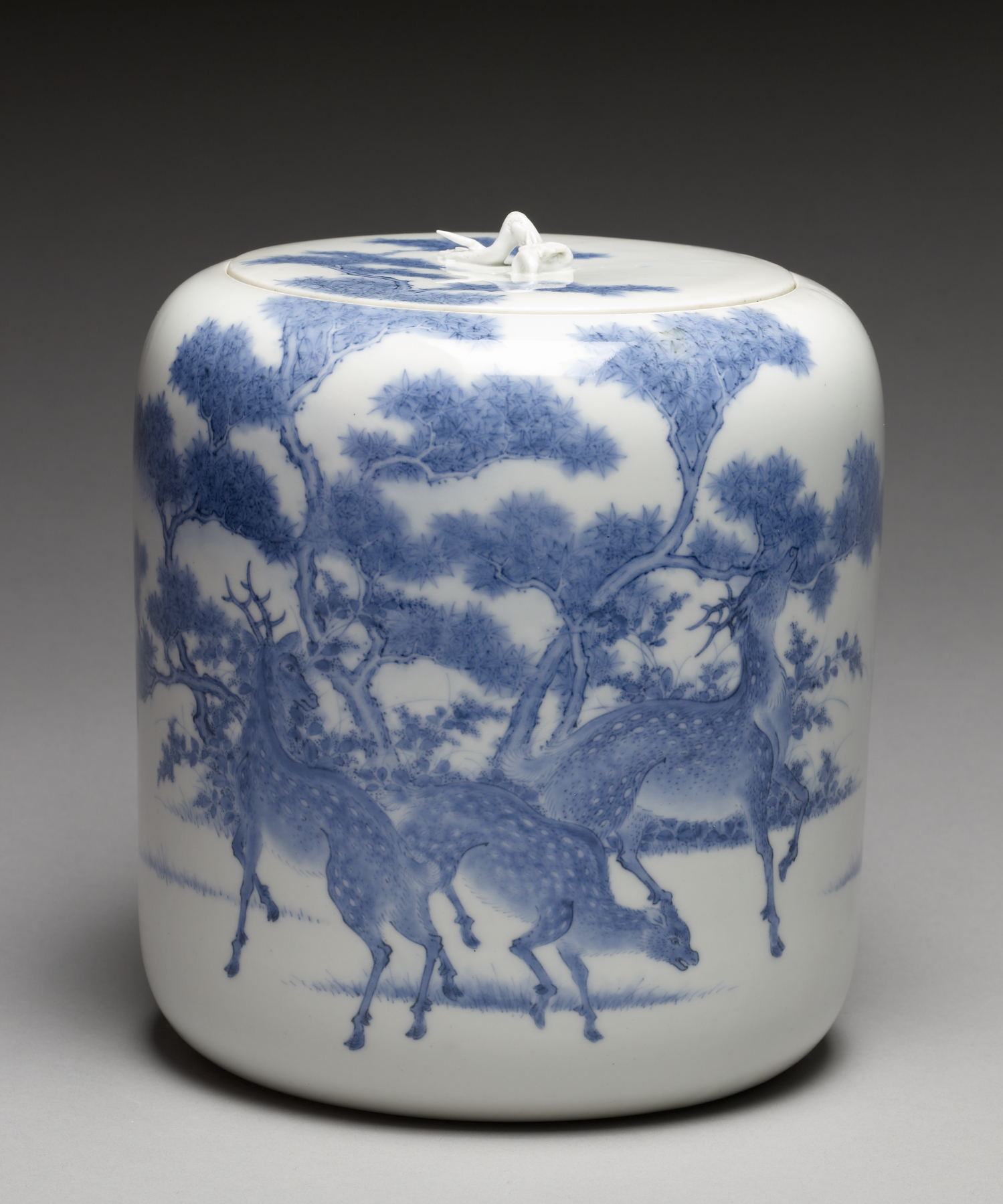
Mizusashi fresh water jar with deer under maple trees decoration by Imamura Rokuro, 1870–1890

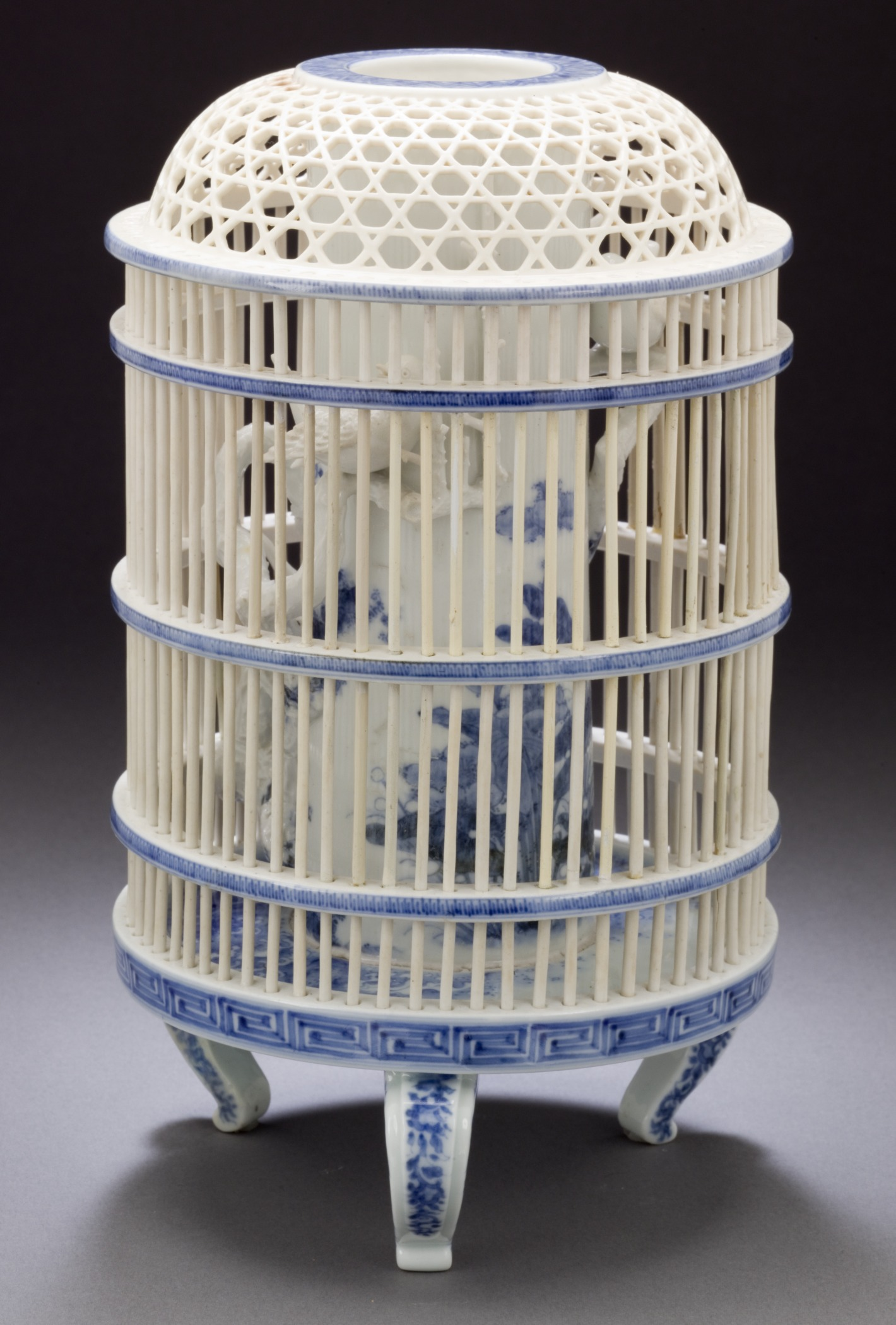
Late 19th century birds in a cage; a showpiece of openwork

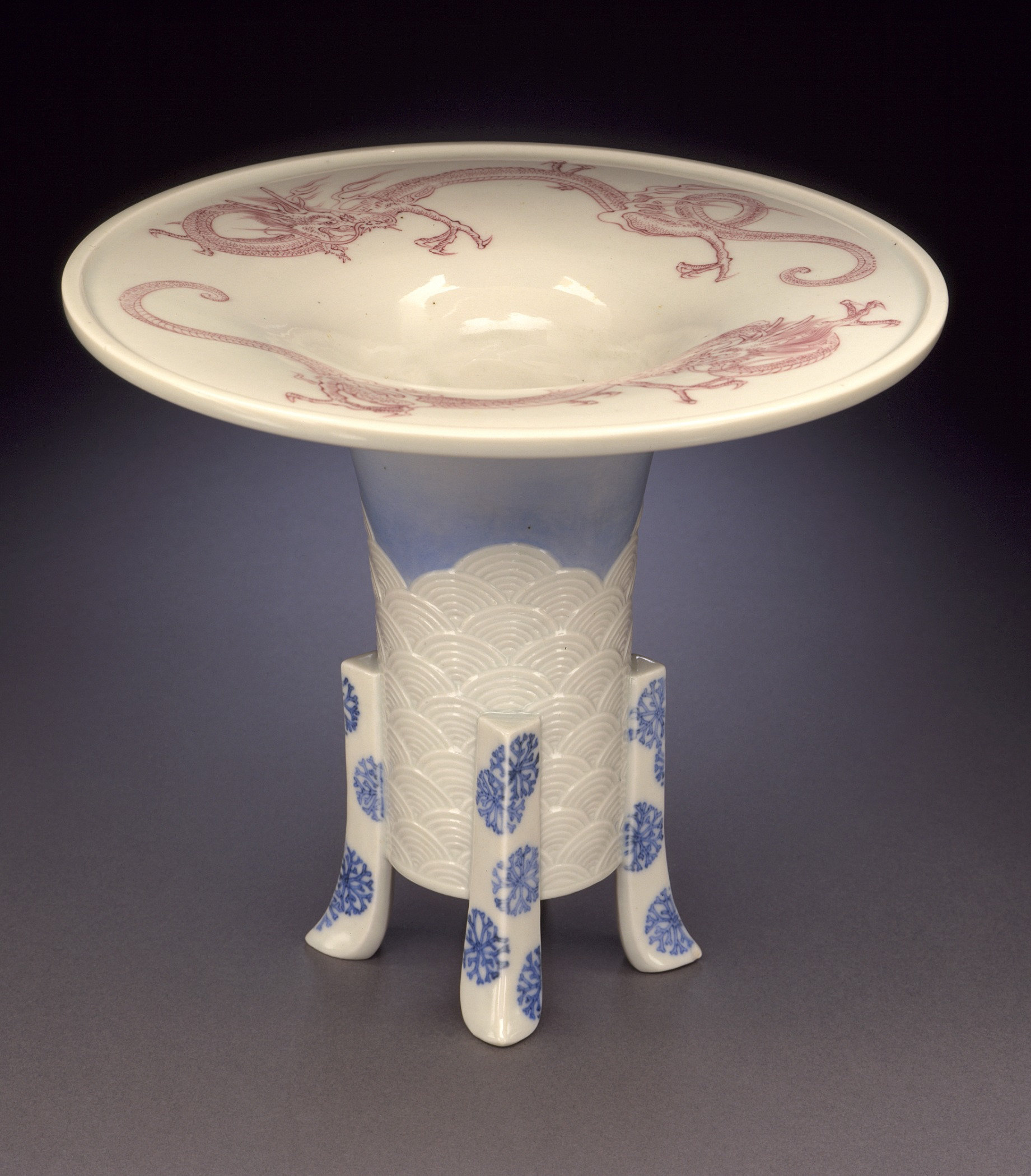
Late 19th century vase with dragons and waves, underglaze blue and red
