= Kunio Nakamura (artist) =

Kunio Nakamura ナカムラクニオ
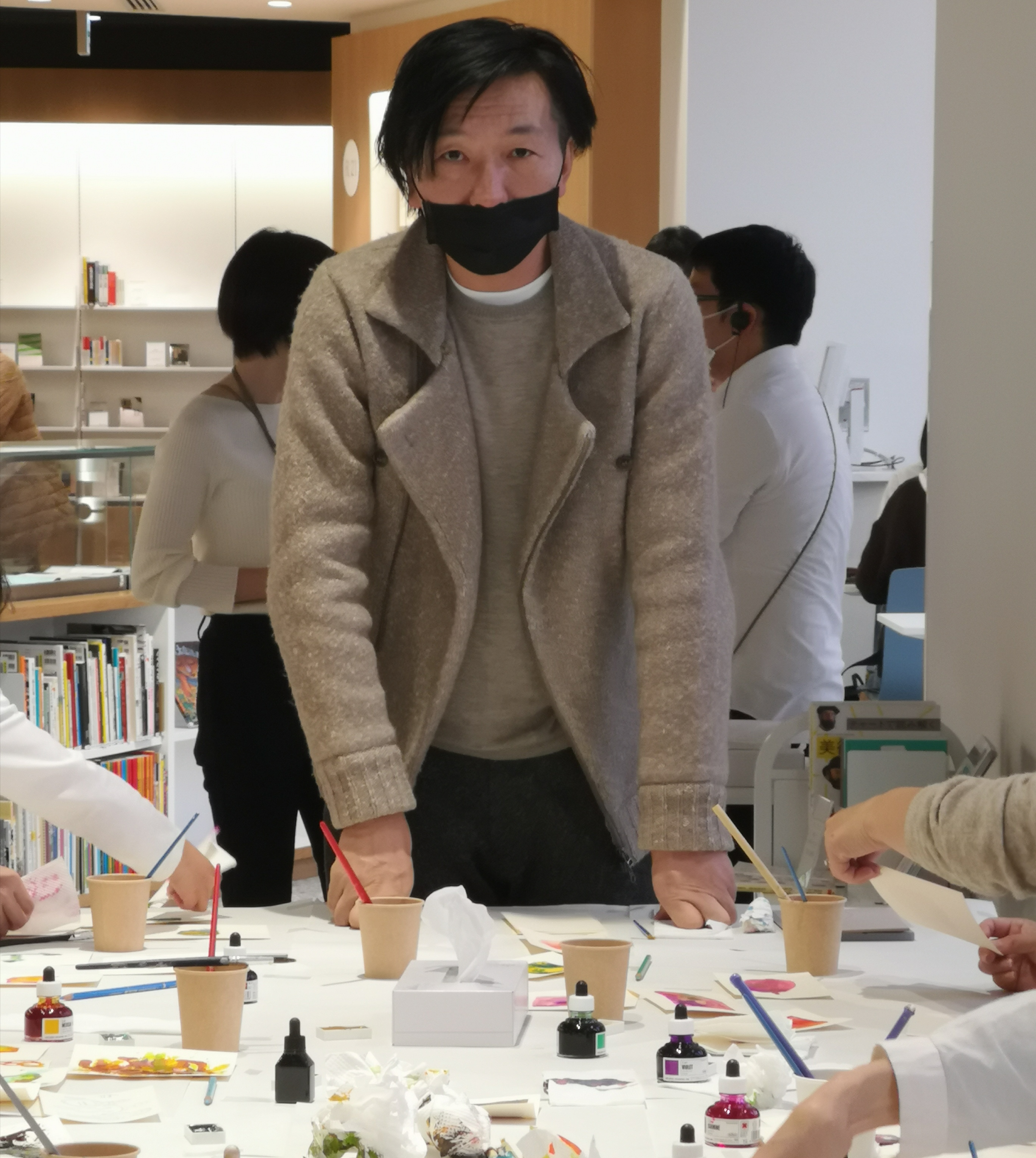
- Born: 2 September 1971 (age 54); Tokyo, Japan
- Website: www.galleryrokujigen.com

Kunio Nakamura (born 1971) is a Japanese artist and the founder of the art gallery "6jigen (6th dimension)" based in Ogikubo, Tokyo.

Currently, Nakamura is a painter and kintsugi artist. He holds workshops and exhibitions in Tokyo, Tohoku and Kumamoto, as well as in the United States.

Nakamura co-founded the "Kintsugi Academy" in Los Angeles in 2019, with American painter Makoto Fujimura.

He was an art navigator for the Boston Museum of Fine Arts exhibition at the Tokyo Metropolitan Art Museum in 2022.
