= Kintsugi =

Japanese pottery repair method with gold lacquer

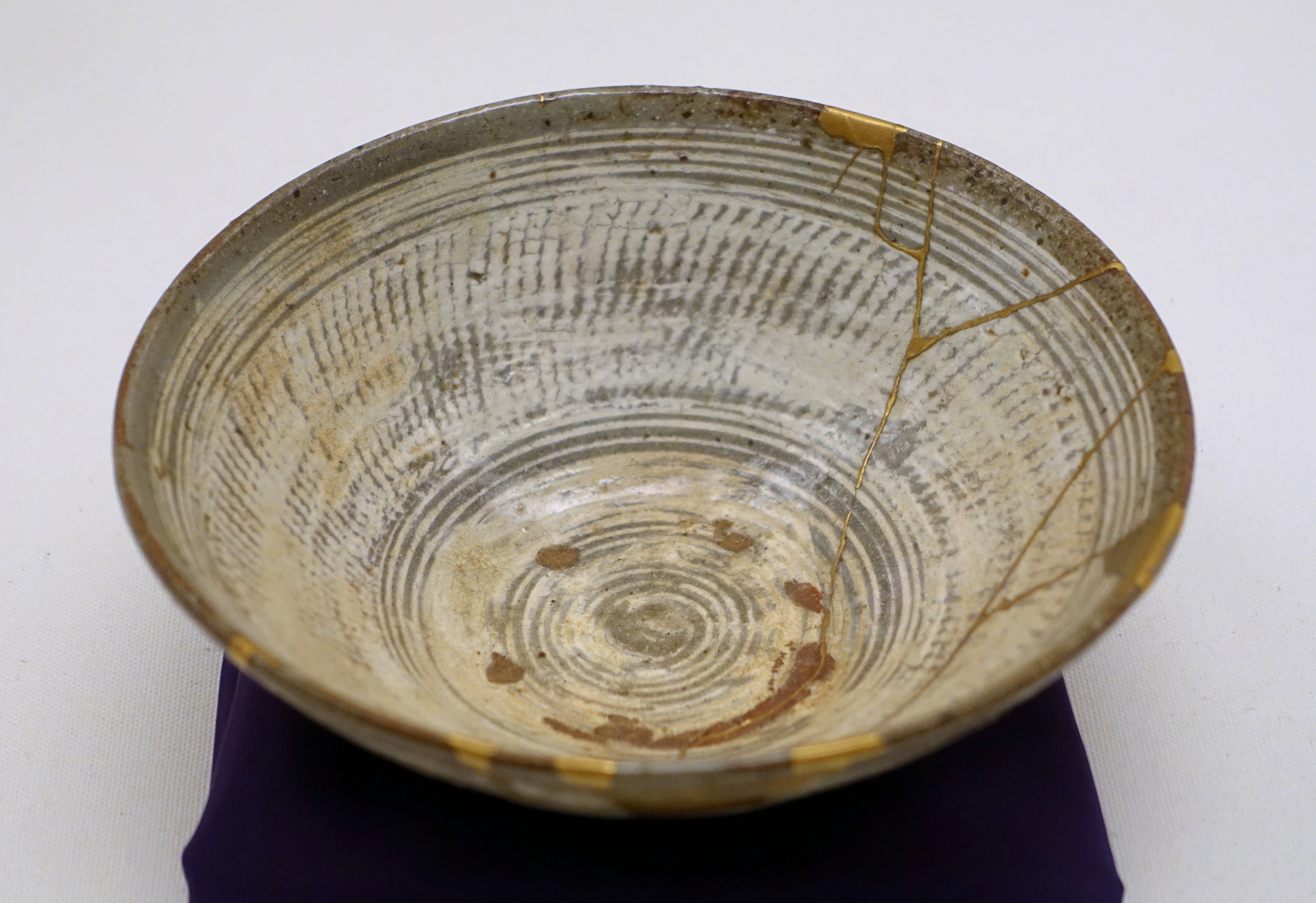
Repair work (right) on Mishima ware hakeme-type tea bowl with kintsugi gold lacquer, 16th century

Kintsugi (Japanese: [kɪnˈtsuːɡi] or [kʲint͡sɯɡʲi]; Japanese: 金継ぎ, lit. 'golden joinery'), also known as kintsukuroi (金繕い, "golden repair"), is the Japanese art of repairing broken pottery by mending the areas of breakage with urushi lacquer dusted or mixed with powdered gold, silver, or platinum. The method is similar to the maki-e technique. As a philosophy, it treats breakage and repair as part of the history of an object, rather than something to disguise.

== History ==
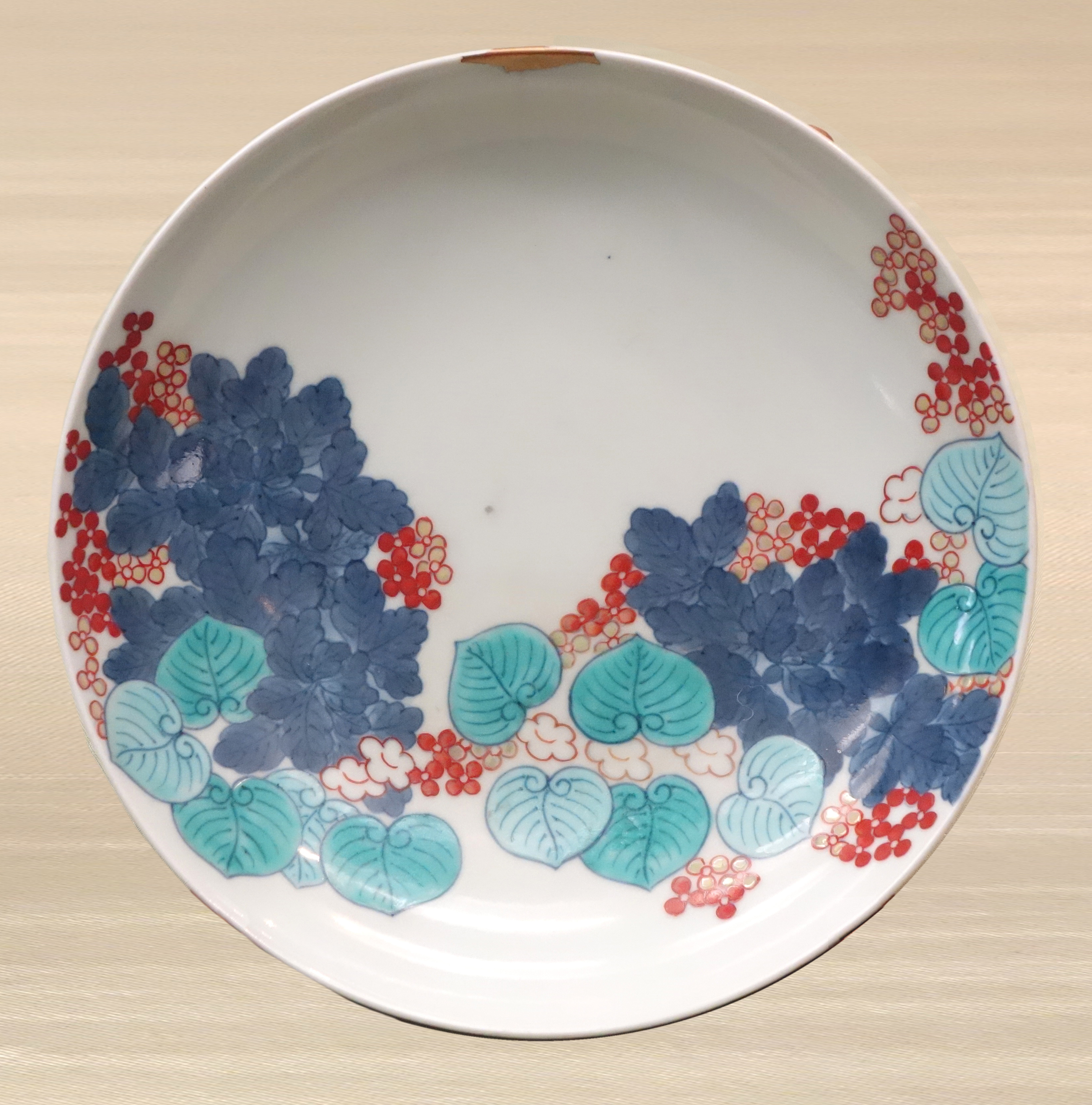
Small repair (top) on Nabeshima ware dish with hollyhock design, over-glaze enamel, 18th century, Edo period

Kintsugi became closely associated with ceramic vessels used for chanoyu (Japanese tea ceremony). One theory is that kintsugi may have originated when Japanese shōgun Ashikaga Yoshimasa sent a damaged Chinese tea bowl back to China for repairs in the late 15th century. When it was returned, repaired with simple metal staples, it may have prompted Japanese craftsmen to look for a more aesthetically pleasing means of repair. On the other hand, according to Bakōhan Saōki (record of tea-bowl with a 'large-locust' clamp), such "ugliness" was considered inspirational and Zen-like, as it connoted beauty in broken things. The bowl thus became highly valued due to the large metal staples, which looked like a locust, and the bowl was named 'bakōhan ("large-locust clamp").

Collectors became so enamored of the new art that some were accused of deliberately smashing valuable pottery so it could be repaired with the gold seams of kintsugi. It is also possible that a pottery piece was chosen for deformities it had acquired during production, then deliberately broken and repaired, instead of being discarded.

The technique of kintsugi was also applied to ceramic pieces with origins outside of Japan, including China, Vietnam, and Korea.

== Philosophy ==
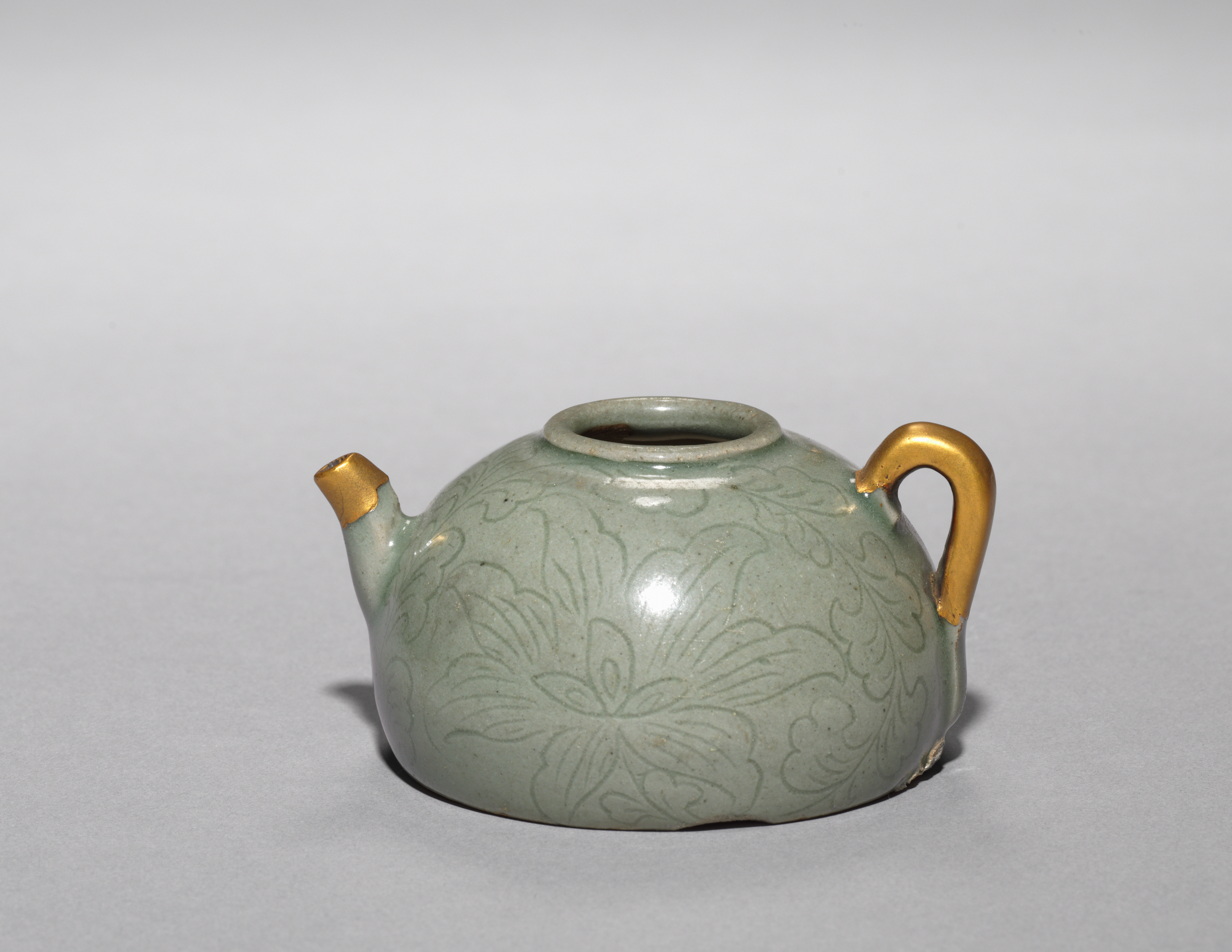
Korean Goryeo ware wine ewer with spout and handle repaired with gold lacquer by a Japanese collector in the early 20th century.

As a philosophy, kintsugi is similar to the Japanese philosophy of wabi-sabi, an embracing of the flawed or imperfect.

Japanese aesthetics values marks of wear from the use of an object. This can be seen as a rationale for keeping an object around even after it has broken. It can also be understood as a justification of kintsugi itself, highlighting cracks and repairs as events in the life of an object, rather than allowing its service to end at the time of its damage or breakage.

The philosophy of kintsugi can also be seen as a variant of the adage "Waste not, want not."

Kintsugi can relate to the Japanese philosophy of mushin (無心, "no mind"), which encompasses the concepts of non-attachment, acceptance of change, and fate as aspects of human life.

Not only is there no attempt to hide the damage, but the repair is literally illuminated... a kind of physical expression of the spirit of mushin....Mushin is often literally translated as "no mind", but carries connotations of fully existing within the moment, of non-attachment, of equanimity amid changing conditions. ...The vicissitudes of existence over time, to which all humans are susceptible, could not be clearer than in the breaks, the knocks, and the shattering to which ceramic ware too is subject. This poignancy or aesthetic of existence has been known in Japan as mono no aware, a compassionate sensitivity, or perhaps identification with, [things] outside oneself.

— Christy Bartlett, Flickwerk: The Aesthetics of Mended Japanese Ceramics

== Materials and types of joinery ==
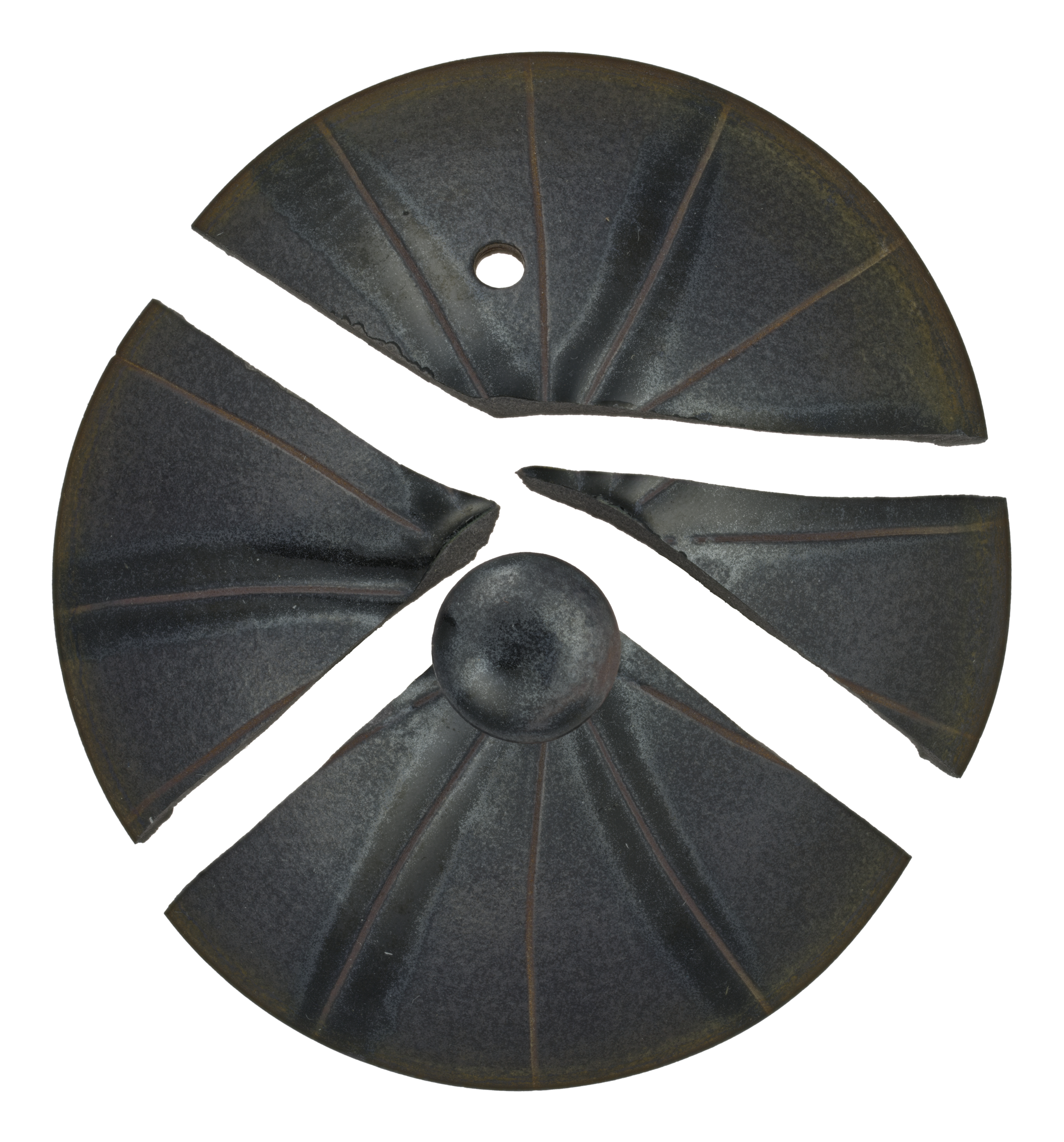
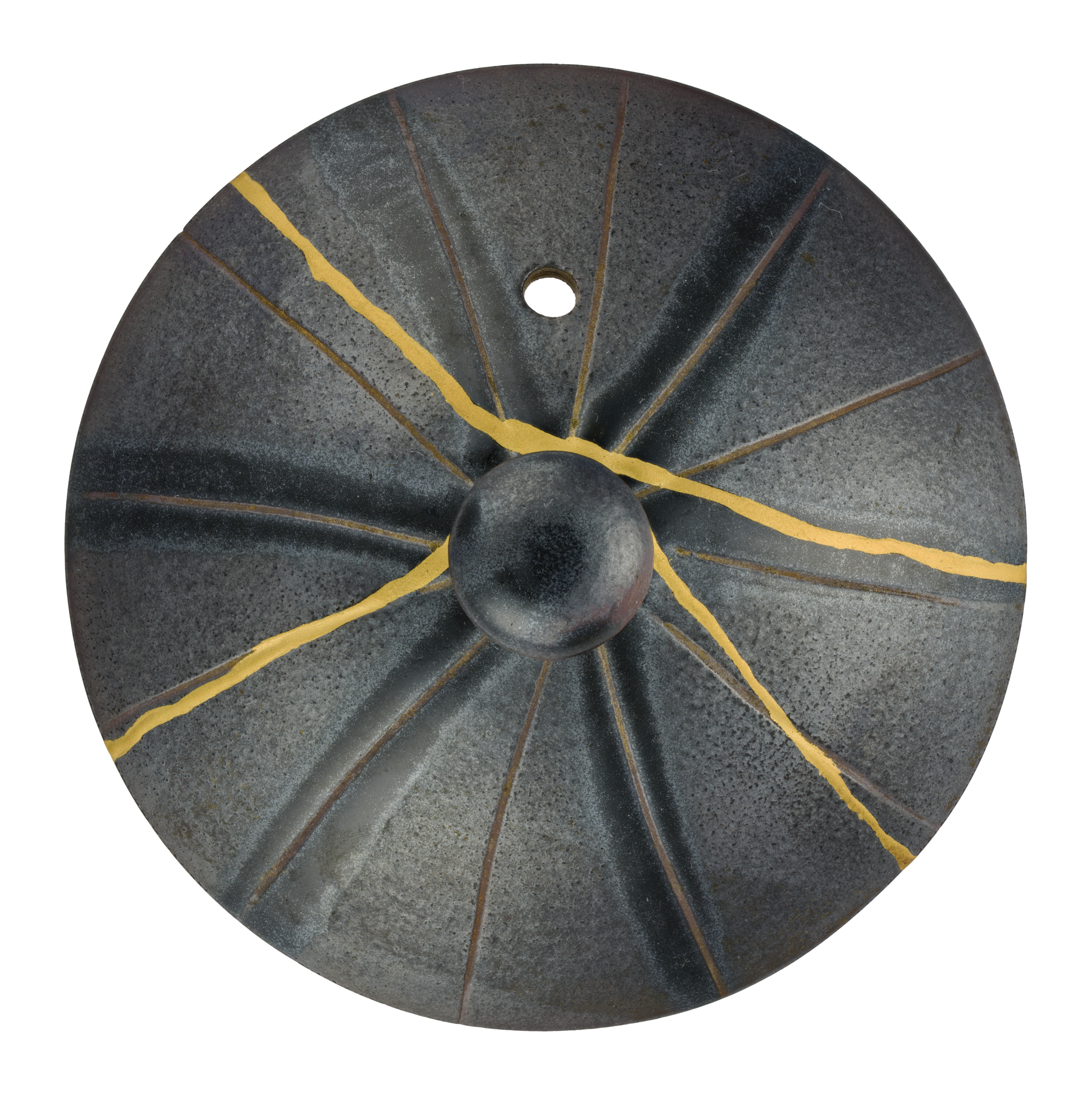
Example for using Kintsugi to repair broken pottery
Left: The broken lid of a yokode Kyūsu
Right: The same lid repaired using the Kintsugi technique

There are a few major styles or types of kintsugi:

- Crack (ひび), the use of gold dust and resin or lacquer to attach broken pieces with minimal overlap or fill-in from missing pieces
- Piece method (欠けの金継ぎ例); if a replacement ceramic fragment is not available and the entirety of the addition is gold or gold/lacquer compound
- Joint call (呼び継ぎ), the use of a similarly shaped but non-matching fragment to replace a missing piece from the original vessel creating a patchwork effect

The key materials of kintsugi are ki urushi (pure urushiol-based lacquer), bengara urushi (iron red urushi), mugi urushi (a mixture of 50% ki urushi and 50% wheat flour), sabi urushi (a mixture of ki urushi with two kinds of clay), and a storage compartment referred to as a furo ("bath" in Japanese) where the mended pottery can rest at 90% humidity for between 2 days to 2 weeks as the urushi hardens. Traditionally, a wooden cupboard and bowls of hot water were used as the furo. Alternatively, thick cardboard boxes are sometimes used as the furo as they create a steady atmosphere of humidity or large vessels filled with rice, beans, or sand into which the mended pottery is submerged.

== Influence ==
Kintsugi is the general concept of highlighting or emphasizing imperfections, visualizing mends and seams as an additive or an area to celebrate or focus on, rather than absence or missing pieces.

Modern artists and designers experiment with the technique as a means of analyzing the idea of loss, synthesis, and improvement through destruction and repair or rebirth. Through an artistic lens, a Kintsugi object is permanently both evidence of crisis and cure.

While originally ignored as a separate art form, kintsugi and related repair methods have been featured at exhibitions at the Freer Gallery at the Smithsonian, the Metropolitan Museum of Art, and the Herbert F. Johnson Museum of Art.

Examples of contemporary artists and designers who incorporate kintsugi techniques, aesthetics, and philosophies in their work include:

- British artist Charlotte Bailey, who was inspired by kintsugi to create textile works involving the repair of broken vases; her practice involves covering the shards with fabric and stitching them back together using gold metallic thread.
- American artist Karen LaMonte, who creates monumental sculptures of women's clothing worn by seemingly invisible human figures; when a kiln explosion broke a number of these works, LaMonte used kintsugi techniques to repair the ceramic sculptures with gold.
- New York designer George Inaki Root, who worked with Japanese artisans to create a line for his jewelry company Milamore entitled "Kintsugi"; Root told Forbes that the designs were inspired by themes of beauty and brokenness, and his longstanding connection to kintsugi philosophies.
- Los Angeles artist Victor Solomon, who was inspired by kintsugi practices and philosophies to create "Kintsugi Court", a fractured public basketball court in South Los Angeles he repaired with gold-dusted resin. The project was finished in 2020 to coincide with the restart of the NBA season, which had been paused due to the COVID-19 pandemic.
- Japanese contemporary kintsugi artist, Kunio Nakamura
- The sealed cracks on the bodies of the Pokémon Poltchageist and Sinistcha are based on the process of kintsugi.

== Related techniques ==
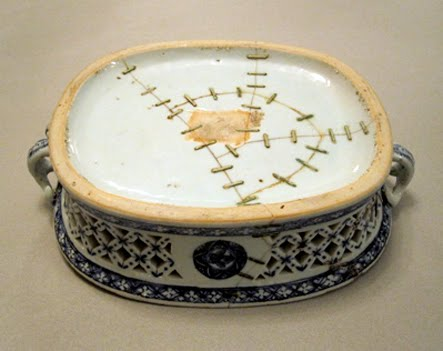
Nanking reticulated basket, c. 1750, mended with metal staples

Staple repair is another technique used to repair broken ceramic pieces, where small holes are drilled on either side of a crack and metal staples are bent to hold the pieces together. Staple repair was used in China, Europe (in ancient Greece, England and Russia among others), South America, as a repair technique for particularly valuable pieces.

Yobitsugi (meaning "invite connection") is similar to kintsugi, except that pieces from visibly different broken objects are put together, patchwork-style, to form one whole one, e.g., pieces of a blue plate to repair a white plate.

Tomotsugi (meaning "companion connection", cf tomodachi "friend") is similar, but uses broken pieces taken from matching objects, e.g., if two matching plates have been broken, some of the pieces can be combined to form a single plate.

== See also ==
- Conservation and restoration of cultural heritage – Process of protecting cultural property
- Conservation and restoration of paintings – Preservation of heritage collections
- Conservator-restorer – Professional responsible for the preservation of artistic and cultural artifacts
- Darning – Sewing technique for repairing holes
- Japanese craft – Handicrafts of Japan
- Mottainai – Japanese term translates as "What a waste!"
- Wabi-sabi – Japanese aesthetic about imperfection
