= Yuki Hayama =

Japanese ceramist

- 葉山有樹
- Born: 1961 (age 64–65); Arita, Nishimatsuura, Saga Prefecture, Japan

Yuki Hayama (Japanese:葉山有樹, born 1961) is a Japanese ceramic artist. His work combines traditional patterns with a unique historical and world view. He is also an author and has written picture books and novels.

The surfaces of his work depict natural or mythological patterns and pictures, covering the surface of the vessel with no gaps. When creating some of his floral works, he utilizes 5 different pigmented glazes layered upon each other to create 72 different colors. His works may require as many as 12 firings in order to complete all the desired hues.

Artist's view on patterns: "Rather than copying traditional patterns, we explore the original meaning of the patterns, search for their roots, take history into account, and add our own unique sensibilities to create them, thereby getting one step closer to true universality and eternal beauty."

== Biography ==
Hayama was born in 1961 in Arita, Nishimatsuura, Saga Prefecture.

In 1975, entered the Design Department of Saga Prefectural Arita Technical High School (night school) and joined a local potter's studio.

In 1985, he opened Hayama Yuki Kiln in Yamauchi-cho, Takeo City, Saga Prefecture.

=== Publications ===
- A Thousand Years of Flowers - The World of Miniature Paintings: Collection of Yuki Hayama's Works (2002)
- Melody of Poetic Thoughts: A Collection of Yuki Hayama's Works (2005)
- A Pattern Odyssey: A 4.5 million year journey through patterns (2007)
- The Girl Who Became a Fish (2008), picture book
- Ripples of Myth: Glass and Sword (2008), novel
- Flying Dangomushi (Dangobug) (2010) fairy tale
- Seed Collection (2012), short story anthology
- Impermanence (2018) collection of works

== Exhibitions ==
- In 1990 (Heisei 2), his first solo exhibition was held at the All Nippon Airways Hotel in Fukuoka.
- In 1991 (Heisei 3), the "World of Miniature Paintings: Yuki Hayama Exhibition" was held at the Tokyo American Club.
  - Exhibited at Uraku Main Gallery in Yurakucho Marion.
- In 1998 (Heisei 10), an exhibition was held at the OAG German Cultural Museum.
- 2004 (Heisei 16) Lecture on "Changes in Patterns" at the Fukuoka International Forum.
- In 2007, “A Pattern odyssey YUKI HAYAMA Exhibition” was held at Spiral Garden (Tokyo).
  - “A Pattern odyssey: A 4.5 million year journey through patterns” published
  - "Yuki Hayama Exhibition Ceramic Stories" will be held at the Design Museum in Helsinki, Finland.
  - Residency and production at Iittala Arabia Kiln in Finland.
- 2008 (Heisei 20): To commemorate the 150th anniversary of Japan-France friendship, "Lalique and Yuki Hayama joint exhibition" was held at Yokohama Yamate Western Museum.
- 2009 (Heisei 21) Participated in German optical equipment Eschenbach product
- 2011 (Heisei 23) “Flying Dungeon Bug” Publication Commemoration Exhibition
  - The 2nd “A Pattern odyssey YUKI HAYAMA Exhibition” was held at Spiral Garden (Tokyo).
- 2012 (Heisei 24) “Craft Futurism” exhibition at 21st Century Museum of Contemporary Art, Kanazawa
- Participated in “Dogo Onsenato” in 2014
- 2015 (Heisei 27) “Craft Futurism” exhibition at New York Art & Design Museum in New York, United States
- 2016 "Beauty of Life" Exhibition Tokyo & New York City, United States
- 2021 "Garden of Dreams" Solo Exhibition in New York City, United States
- 2023 Decorated vase with over 500 Pokémon-themed illustrations exhibited at Kanazawa National Crafts Museum and Los Angeles
