= Nabeshima ware =

Type of Japanese porcelain ware

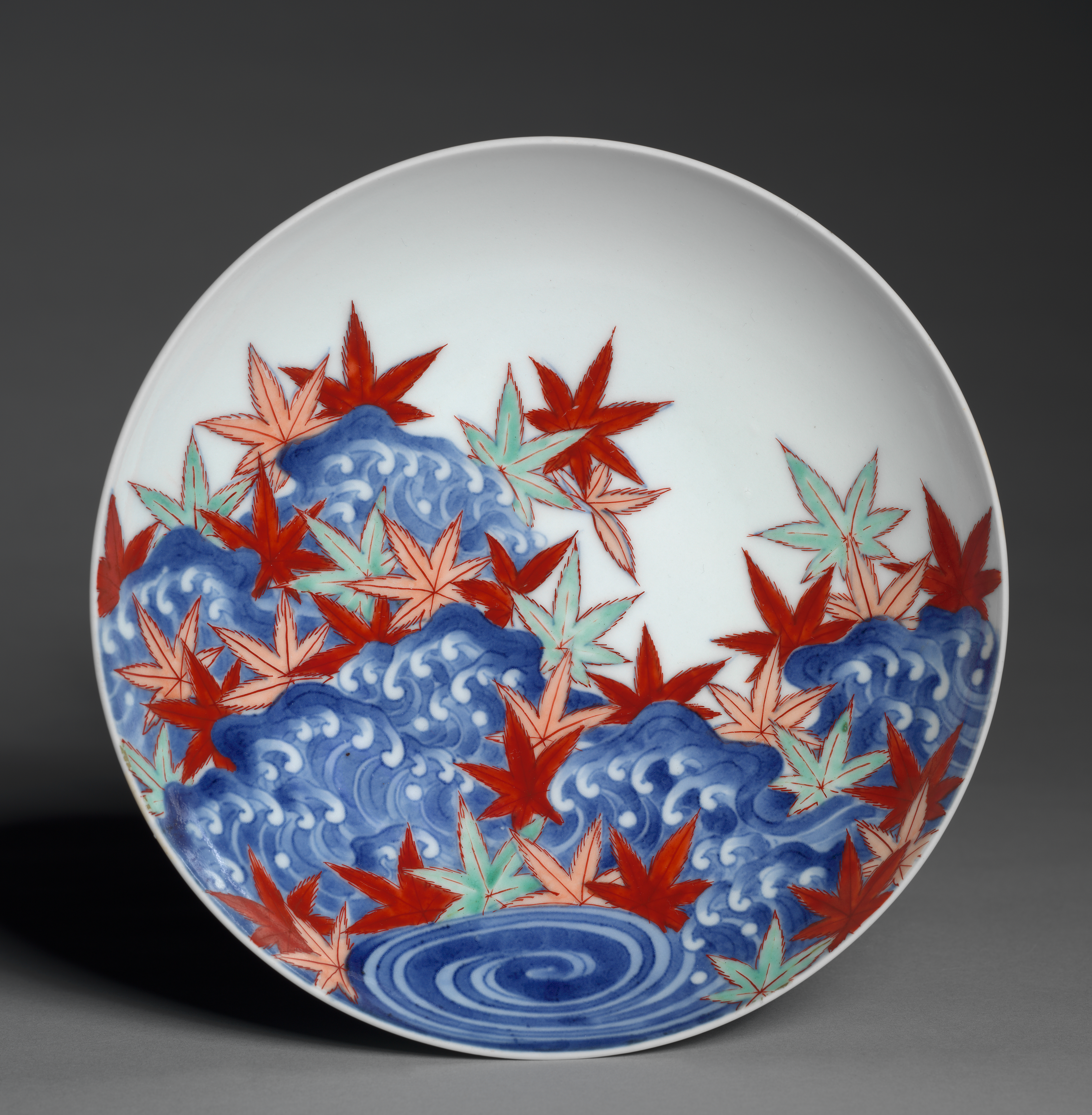
Polychrome dish with maple leaves floating on waves, late 17th–early 18th century

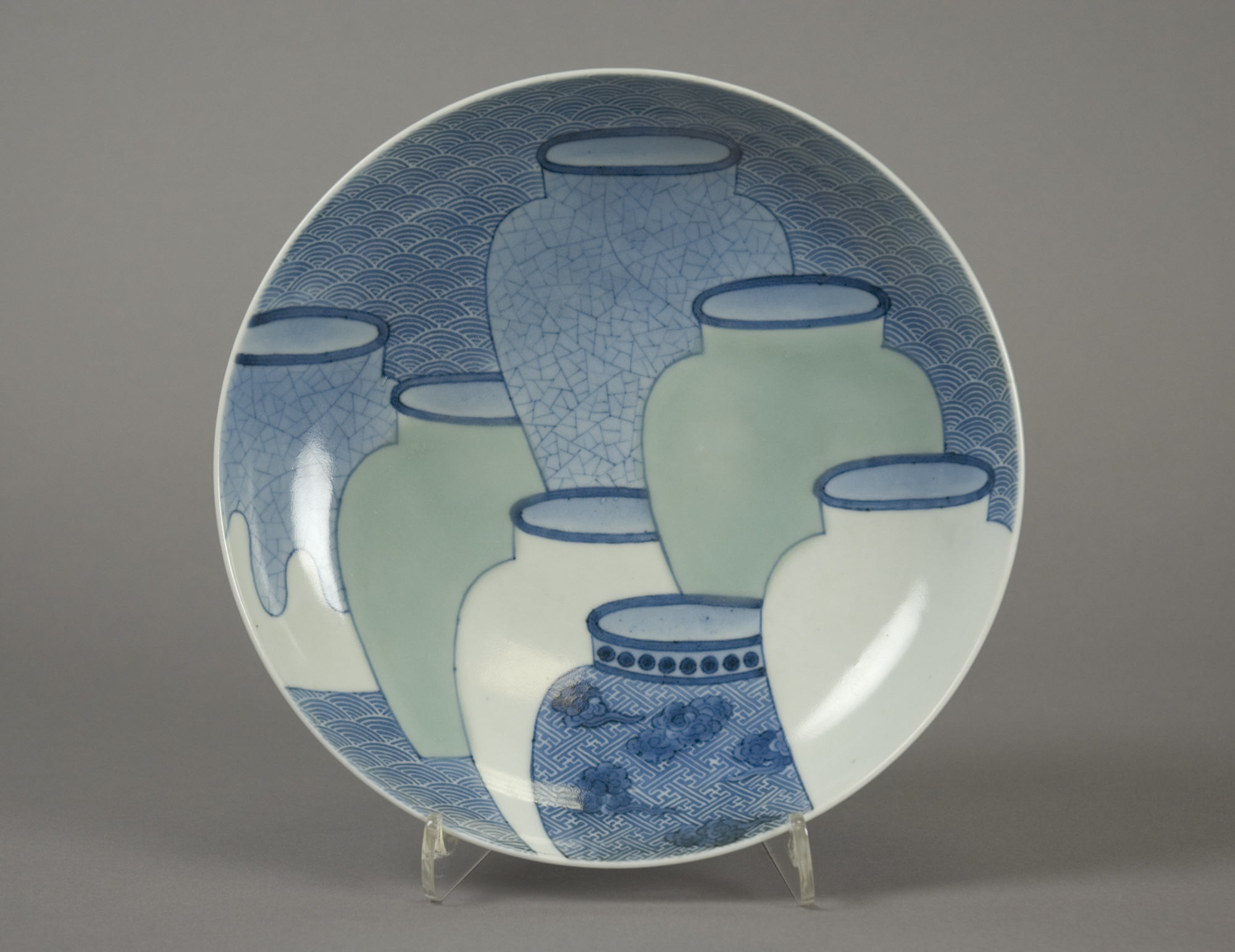
Celadon-glazed dish with seven jars in underglaze blue, c. 1700–1720

Nabeshima ware (鍋島, Nabeshima) is a group of high-grade Japanese porcelain produced under the direct patronage and administration of the Saga Domain, ruled by the Nabeshima clan, during the Edo period. Production became centred at the domain kiln at Ōkawachiyama in the 17th century.

Unlike most porcelain made by the commercial kilns of the Hizen region, Nabeshima ware was produced principally for presentation to the Tokugawa shogunate, for gifts to other daimyō, and for use within the Nabeshima household. Its production was tightly controlled and was not intended for sale on the general market.

Nabeshima ware includes underglaze-blue, celadon, iron-glazed and polychrome overglaze-enamelled porcelains. It is particularly associated with precisely formed dishes in standardised sizes, technically controlled decoration and designs drawing upon Japanese textiles, paintings and the natural world. The vessels were not merely decorative objects but formed part of the tableware used by Japan's ruling classes. The Agency for Cultural Affairs describes the polychrome tradition known as iro-Nabeshima as especially important in the history of Japanese decorative arts, while individual works from the height of Nabeshima production have been designated Important Cultural Properties.

The domain kiln was abolished in 1871 following the abolition of the domain system. Its polychrome techniques were subsequently reorganised and transmitted by the Imaizumi Imaemon family, whose workshop had formerly carried out overglaze decoration for the domain kiln; the iro-Nabeshima tradition is now recognised as an Important Intangible Cultural Property of Japan.

== Characteristics ==
The main products of Nabeshima ware were circular plates, with standardized diameters, typically in sets of five or ten pieces with the same design. There are also tripod plates with short legs around the base, octagonal plates, and deformed plates such as flower-shaped plates., but these are comparatively rare. Nabeshima plates have a unique shape called mokuhai-gata, which has a high base when viewed from the side and a taut curve from the base to the edge.. Although there are also products such as vases and bottles, lidded bowls, and incense burners, there are only a few examples of each. Tea wares, which were actively produced at other kilns in the same period, were never produced at Nabeshima.

In addition to the colored painting known as "Iro-Nabeshima," occasionally "blue-and-white" designs using cobalt blue, celadon or a rusty glaze are known to exist. The most common "Iro-Nabeshima" is a technique in which a design is painted over a vessel with a blue-and-white design, and then the vessel is fired again with a low-temperature oxidizing flame. "Iro-Nabeshima" generally uses only the three colors red, yellow, and green, and occasionally black and purple are used, but as a rule, gold leaf, as seen in Imari, is not used. In China and other Japanese kilns, celadon glaze is generally used alone, but Nabeshima often combines celadon with blue and white glaze and colored paintings, such as "blue and white glaze" and "blue and white painting". The patterns are diverse, including geometric designs such as chintz and snowflake patterns, stylized drawings of plants, vegetables, and utensils, and pictorial landscapes, but all of them are characterized by their purely Japanese designs, which distinguishes them from Imari ware, which was modeled on Chinese traditions. Some Nabeshima works also depict subjects that have no allegorical or symbolic meaning, such as radishes, carrots, and eggplants. Some Nabeshima plates from the heyday have designs that only appear on the edges, with the center left blank A distinctive feature of Nabeshima plates is that the top and bottom of the design on the front and back are linked. On the back of the plate, three pattern units are arranged at equal intervals, so that one of the corners of the triangle they form coincides with the upper part of the image on the front of the plate. The sides of the foot often feature a comb-tooth pattern. It is customary to leave no inscriptions within the foot, and to finish it in solid white.

== Ōkawachi Nabeshima Kiln Site ==
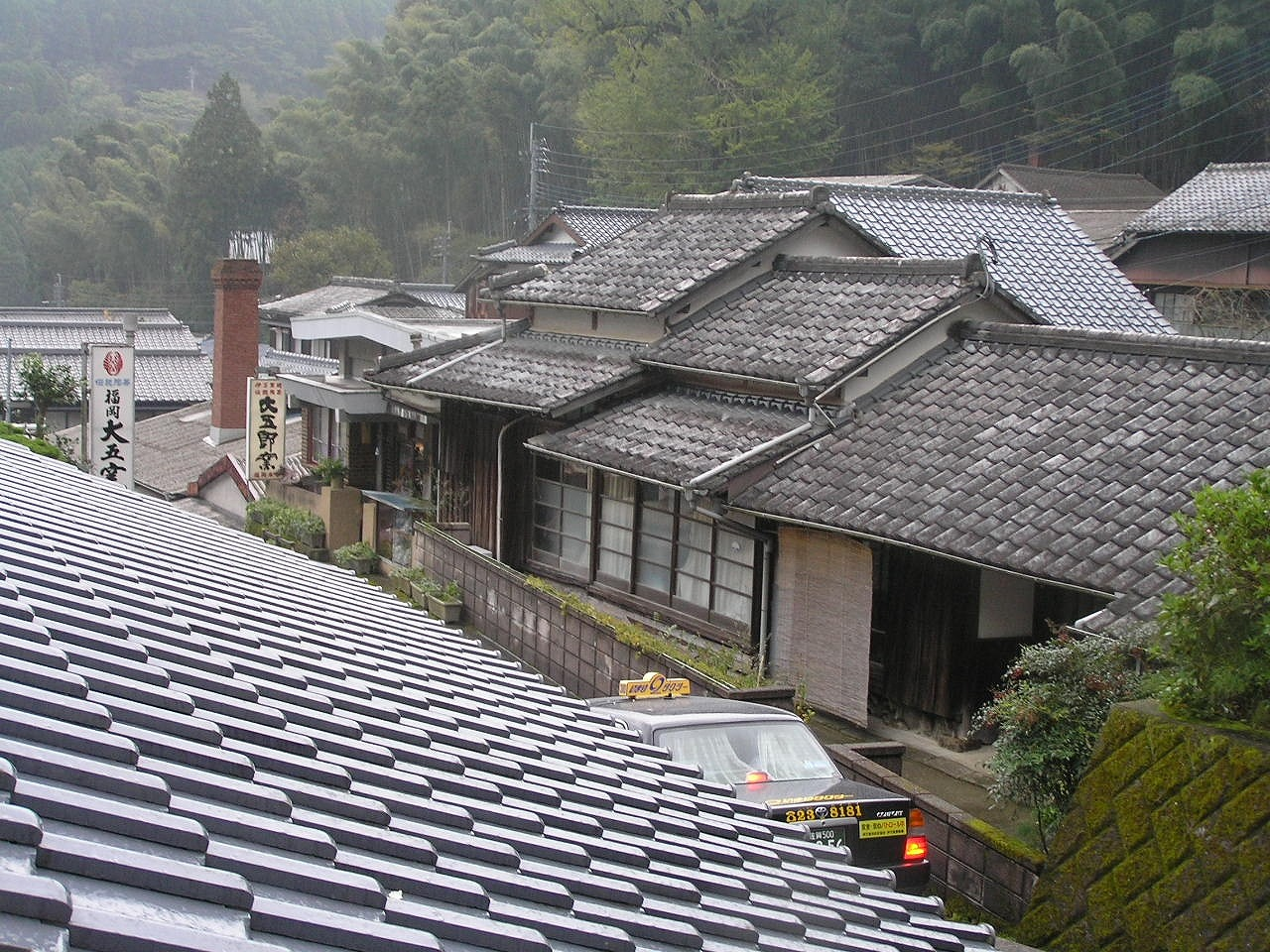
Ōkawachi kiln site

The Ōkawachi kiln site (大川内鍋島窯跡, Ōkawachi Nabeshima kama ato) was designated a National Historic Site in 2003. Currently, the remains of the official kiln, dumping ground for defective products, storage hut for refractory containers, pottery production site, the clan official residence, and the potter's residences remain over a wide area within the historic site. The kiln is estimated to have a horizontal length of about 137 meters, 27 to 30 firing chambers, and a stepped multi-chambered climbing kiln structure. Nabeshima ware was fired in the three central chambers where the fire was the hottest, while the other chambers were used to fire non-Nabeshima ware products. This kiln site is about 10 minutes by car from Imari Station on the JR Kyushu Chikuhi Line.

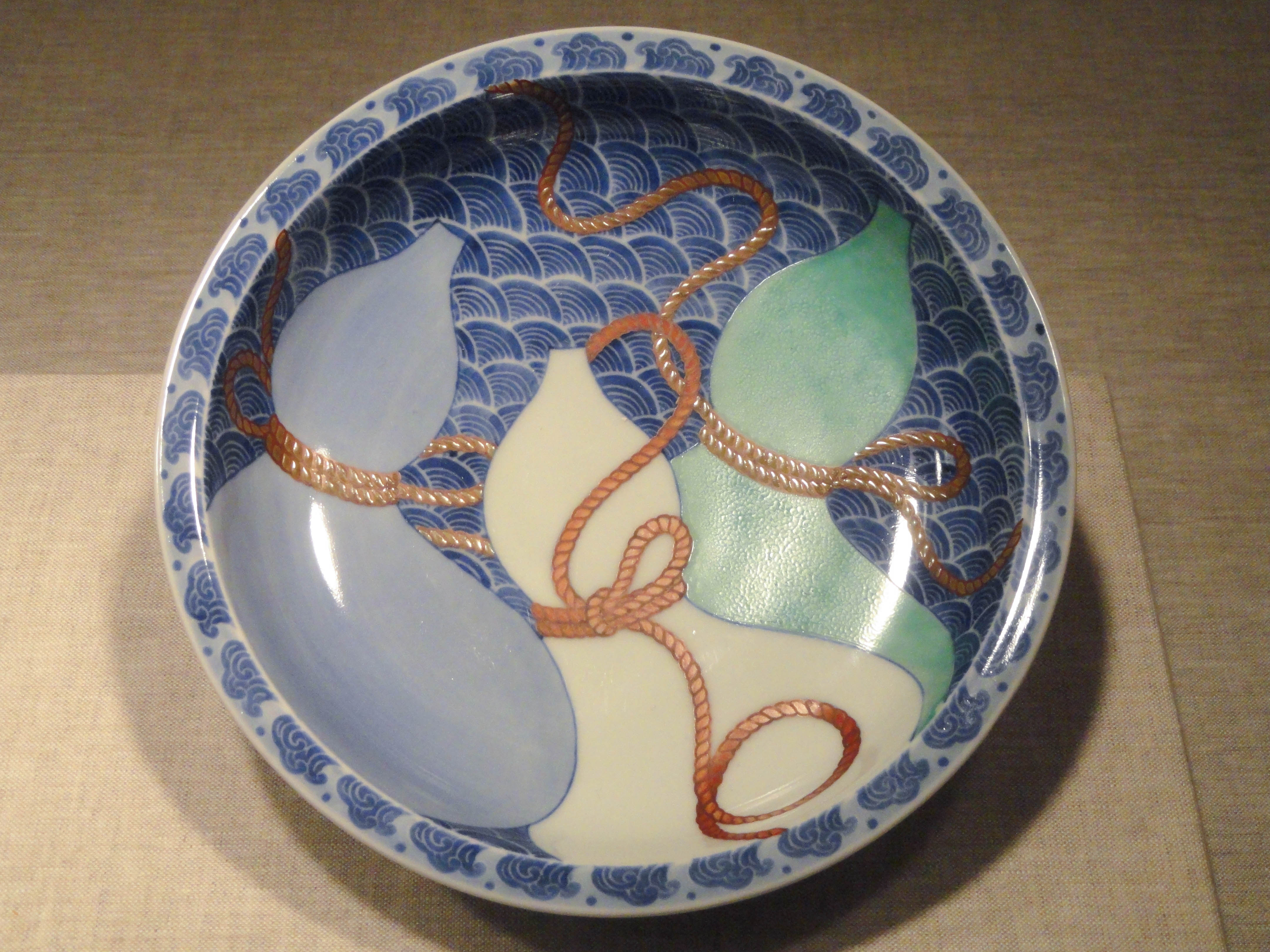
Bowl with gourd flasks design, 18th century, porcelain with enamel

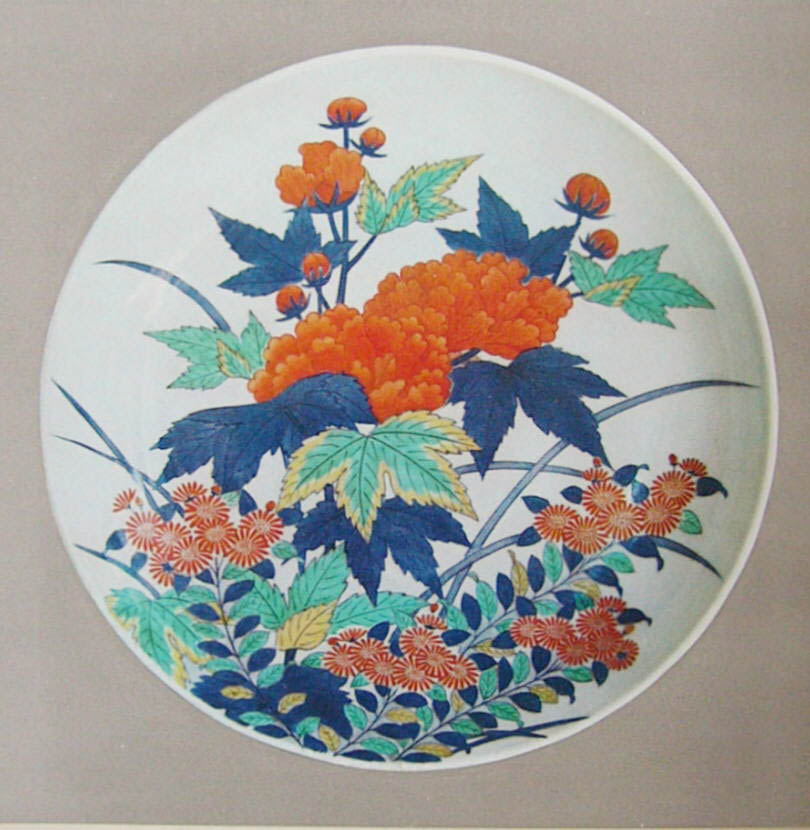
Plate with floral design in the Kakiemon style, Arita, late 17th century, Edo period

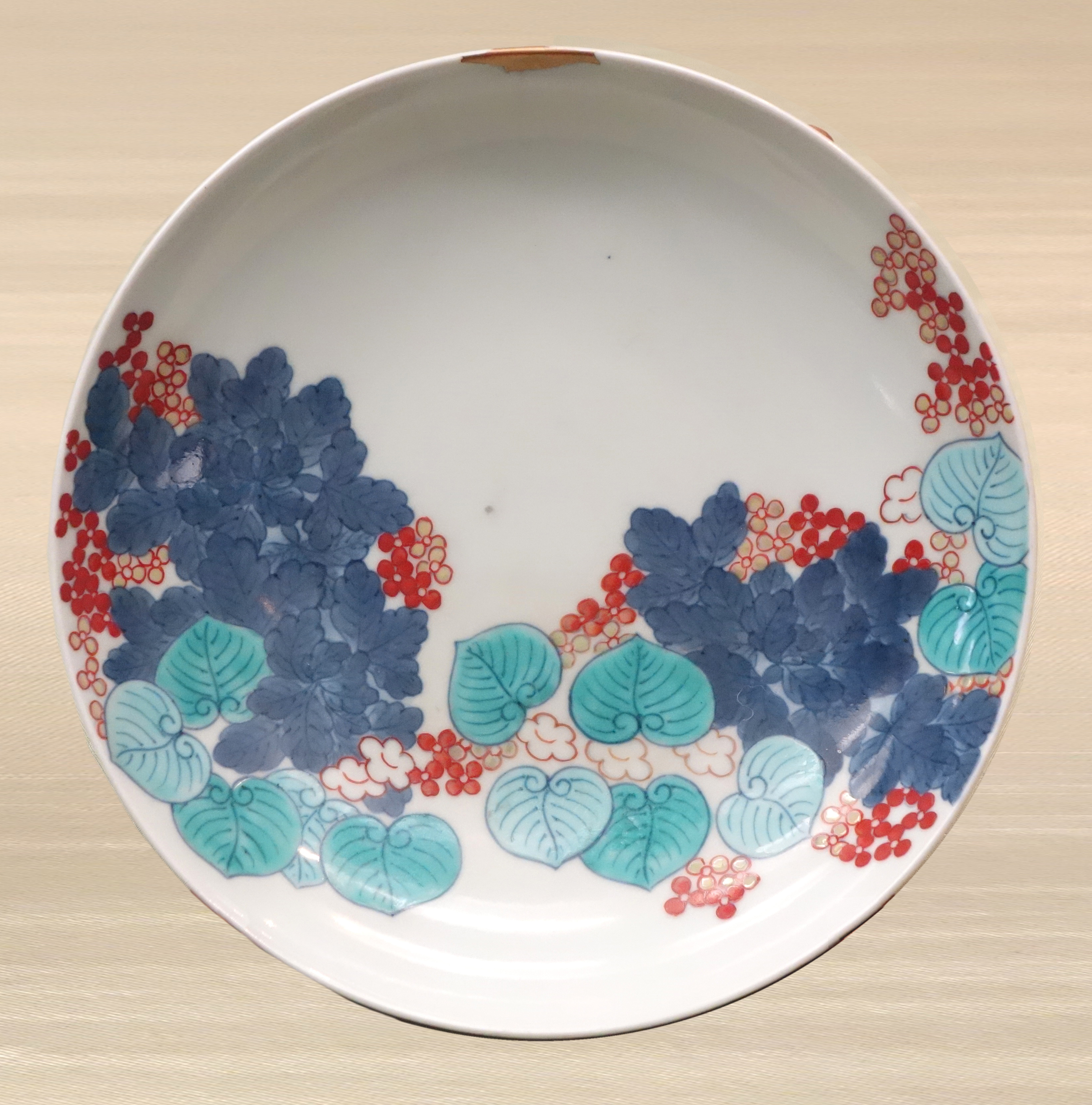
Dish with hollyhock design and small kintsugi repair on top, overglaze enamel, 18th century, Edo period)
