= Butterfield =

Butterfield may refer to:

- Butterfield (surname)
- Butterfield Market

== Places ==
- Butterfield, Dublin, a suburb and townland of Dublin, Ireland
- Butterfield Green, Luton, England

=== United States ===
- Butterfield, Minnesota
- Butterfield, Missouri
- Butterfield, Texas
- Butterfield Township, Michigan
- Butterfield Township, Minnesota
- Butterfield, Illinois

== Fiction ==
- Butterfield, a fictional town in Kansas in L. Frank Baum's 1909 novel The Road to Oz
- Butterfield, a fictional butler of Watkyn Bassett in Wodehouse's Jeeves stories
- Brian Butterfield, overweight salesman character from The Peter Serafinowicz Show

== Other uses ==
- Butterfield Bank, an international bank based in Bermuda
- Butterfield & Butterfield, a large auction house based in San Francisco
- BUtterfield 8, a 1960 film with Elizabeth Taylor and Laurence Harvey based on a novel of the same name by John O'Hara
- Butterfield Museum, a demolished natural sciences museum and academic building at Dartmouth College
- Butterfield Overland Mail, a stagecoach service in the United States operating from 1858 to 1861
- Butterfield station, a light rail station in Sacramento, California, US
- Butterfield and Swire, a British trading company from the 1860s to 1960s
