= Guterman =

Guterman is a surname. Notable people with the surname include:

- Dan Guterman, Brazilian-Canadian-American television writer and producer
- Gerald Guterman, American real estate developer
- Lawrence Guterman (born 1966), Canadian film director
- Norbert Guterman (1900–1984), scholar and translator
