= Jan den Uyl =

Dutch Golden Age painter

Jan Jansz den Uyl the Elder
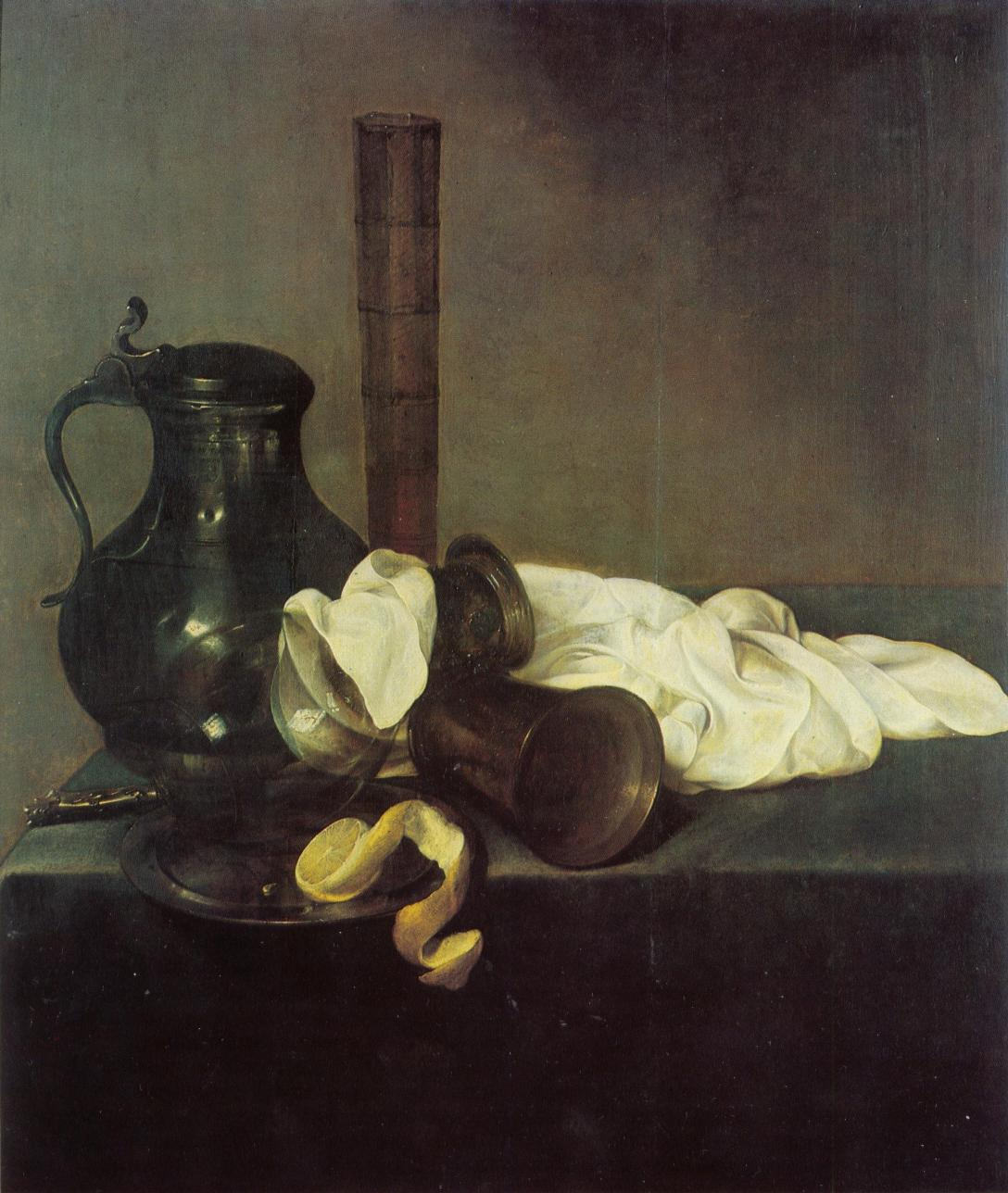
- Still Life (1637) 82 x 69 cm, oil on wood
- Born: 1595/96; Netherlands
- Died: 1639; Amsterdam, Netherlands

Jan Jansz. den Uyl (Utrecht (?), 1595/96 – 24 November 1639) was a painter of the Dutch Golden Age. He very much specialized in the form of still life known as the breakfast piece, or, in the elaborate style of painters like den Uyl, banquet pieces (banketjestukken). He also painted landscapes and animal paintings.

Den Uyl was well known in his time, and Peter Paul Rubens owned three of his paintings. Although den Uyl is nowadays comparatively unknown, one of his paintings, in the collection of Gerald Guterman, has been called the "most beautifully perfect Dutch monochrome still-life in existence".

The Dutch word uyl means "owl", and den Uyl always included the signature motif of an owl in his paintings, often more than once in a single picture. Sometimes the motif is obvious and sometimes it is more covert. For example, in his Breakfast Still Life with Glass and Metalwork (1637–39), in the Museum of Fine Arts, Boston, an owl is incorporated fairly obviously as the decorative finial on a large flagon, but the reflections in the pewter plates are also reminiscent of the face of an owl.

He trained Jan Jansz. Treck, whose sister he married in 1619.

== Sources and external links ==
- Gimelson, Deborah (September 1985). "Portrait of a Businessman as a Collector". Art+Auction. Link to copy of this article.
- Southgate, M. Therese (January 2003). "The Cover: Banquet Piece". JAMA. 289 (3): 265. doi:10.1001/jama.289.3.265. Link
- Breakfast Still Life with Glass and Metalwork in Museum of Fine Arts, Boston catalogue.
