= The Stanhope =

The Stanhope may refer to:

- Stanhope Hotel
- Stanhope essay prize
