= Helen Watterson Moody =

American journalist and essayist

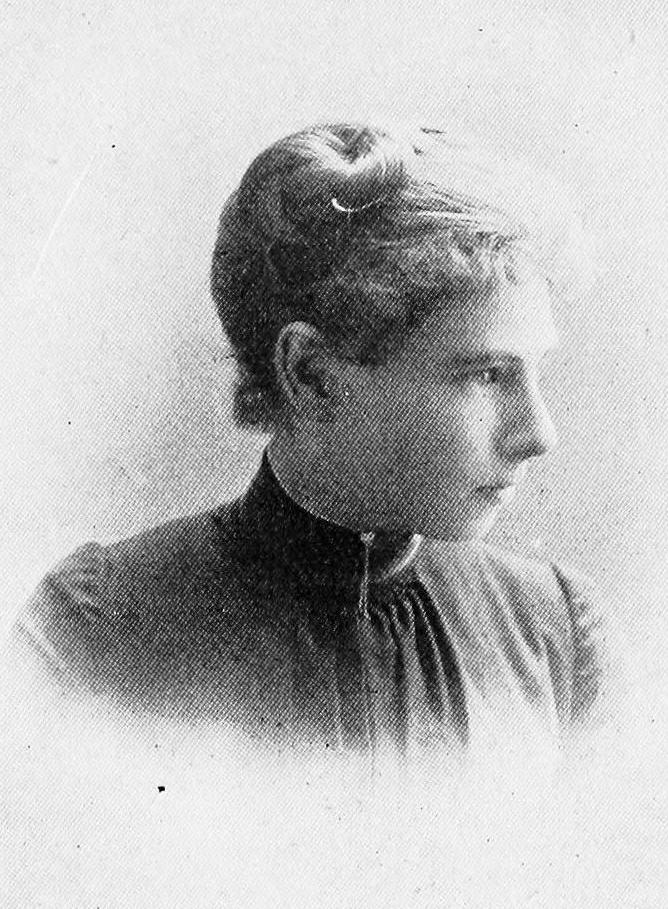
- Moody circa 1893
- Born: May 17, 1860; Cleveland
- Died: December 14, 1928; 1049 Fifth Avenue
- Education: College of Wooster (BA, 1883; MA, 1887)

Helen Watterson Moody (May 17, 1860 – December 14, 1928) was an American journalist and essayist.

Helen Watterson was born on May 17, 1860, in Cleveland, Ohio. She graduated from the College of Wooster with high honors in 1883, and received a master's in 1887.

She began working in journalism as soon as she left college, in the offices of The Cleveland Leader and Sun. After two years, she returned to the College of Wooster as an assistant professor of rhetoric and English. She remained a professor until she joined the staff of the New York Evening Sun in 1889. Until her marriage to Winfield S. Moody, Jr., in 1891, she wrote a column for the New York Sun under the nom de plume "Woman About Town". Albert Shaw reportedly dubbed her the "cleverest newspaper woman in New York" in recognition of those columns. After leaving the Sun, she became an editor at S. S. McClure's publishing house.

Moody's book The Unquiet Sex (1898) is a collection of essays on the place of women in society. In the book, Moody takes issue with women's higher education. She argues that women's colleges ought to be fundamentally different from those for men, in virtue of basic differences between the genders. She also rejects the then-popular institution of a woman's club.

As its name suggests, A Child's Letters to Her Husband (1903) is a collection of fictional letters—"humorous", with "much feeling"—by a girl named Virginia to her future husband. Some of the letters were first published in McClure's in 1899.

She died on December 14, 1928, at the Adams Hotel in New York City (now 1049 Fifth Avenue).
