= Chinese export porcelain =

Porcelain made in China for export

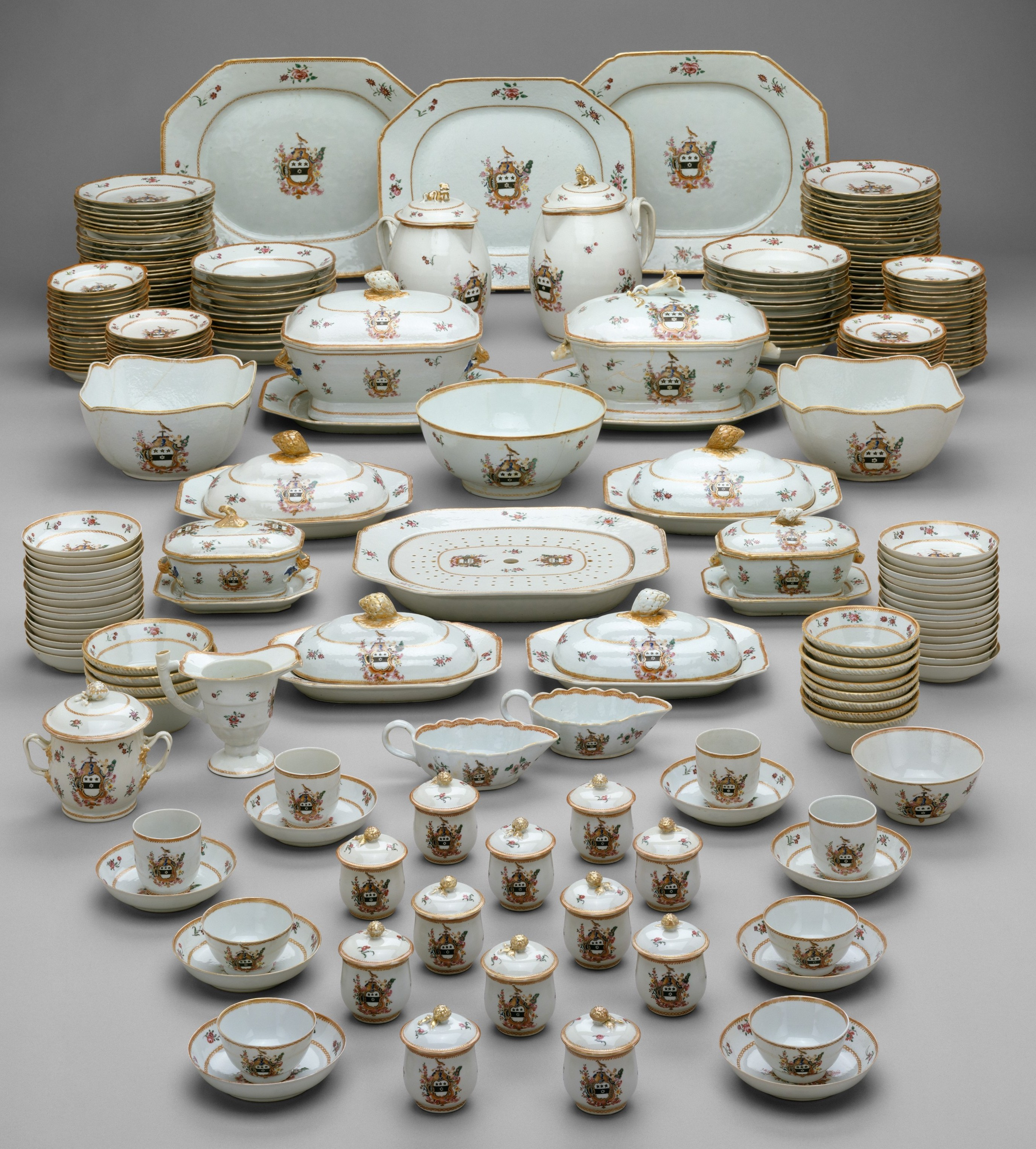
An armorial dinner service for the American market, c. 1785–1790

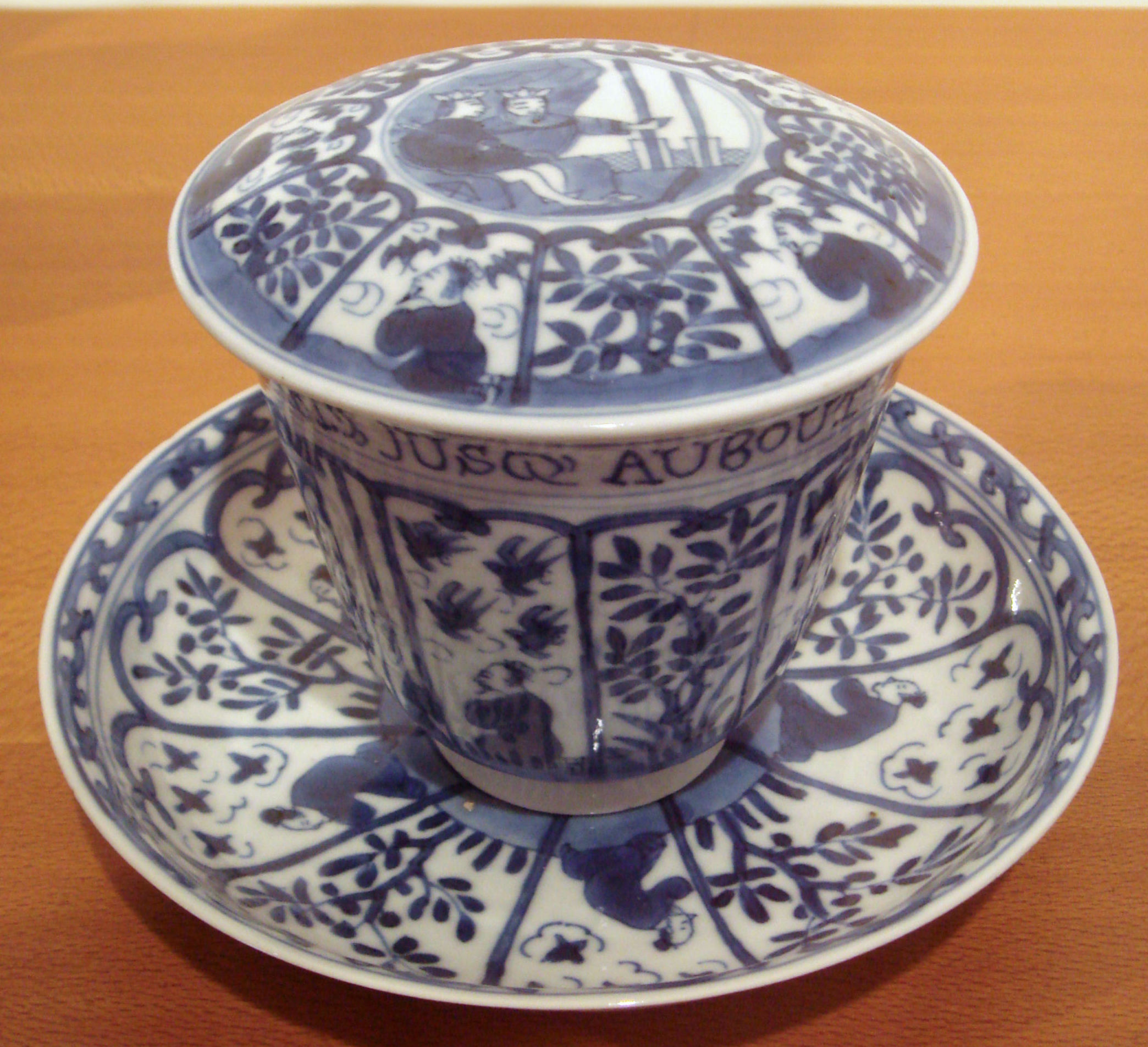
Chinese blue and white export porcelain, with European scene and French inscription "The Empire of virtue is established to the end of the Universe", Kangxi period, 1690–1700

Chinese export porcelain includes a wide range of Chinese porcelain that was made (almost) exclusively for export to Europe and later to North America between the 16th and the 20th century. Whether wares made for non-Western markets are covered by the term depends on context. Chinese ceramics made mainly for export go back to the Tang dynasty if not earlier, though initially they may not be regarded as porcelain.

It is typically not used as a descriptive term for the much earlier wares that were produced to reflect Islamic taste and exported to the Middle East and Central Asia, though these were also very important, apparently driving the development of Chinese blue and white porcelain in the Yuan and Ming dynasties (see Chinese influences on Islamic pottery). Longquan celadon, which is mostly not porcelain on Western definitions, is one of the wares to produce large dishes that reflected Islamic dining habits, rather than the deeper bowls used by the Chinese. In general, wares made for export, especially in the early periods, were "mainly strong and rather roughly-finished articles", compared to those for the elite domestic market, to allow for the stresses of transport, and less sophisticated customers.

Other types of Chinese wares made mainly for export to other markets may or may not be covered; they are certainly described as export wares in discussing the Chinese industry, but much discussion in Western sources only refers to wares intended for Europe. The other types include Swatow ware (c. 1575–1625), made for South-East Asian and Japanese markets, and Tianqi porcelain, made mainly for the Japanese market in the 17th century. Chinese celadons were exported to most of Eurasia, but not Europe, between roughly the Tang and the early Ming dynasties.

It took some time for feedback from export markets to influence the shapes and decoration of the Chinese product, especially in earlier periods, and with distant markets such as Europe. Initially markets were sent what the Chinese market, or older exports markets, liked. With the increasing reach of European trading companies, especially the Dutch VOC, this became possible, and eventually even specific armorial designs could be ordered from Europe.

== Wares for Europe, to the 18th century ==
Europeans purchased some Chinese porcelain from the Ottoman Empire, though these were not made to match European taste. Turkey's acquisitions of Chinese porcelain were sporadic and on a small scale before Sultan Selim I's conquests in Persia, Syria, and Egypt from 1514 to 1517. These brought back large quantities of Chinese porcelain from the royal collections of Tabriz, Damascus, and Cairo. The Topkapi Palace then had the largest collection of Chinese porcelain outside China. European visitors to Istanbul in the fifteenth and sixteenth centuries are recorded as having purchased Chinese porcelain there.

Some other pieces came via the Portuguese settlement of Malacca; King Manuel I had several acquired from Vasco da Gama. The Chamber of Art and Curiosities at Ambras Castle contains the collection of Archduke Ferdinand II of Austria, assembled during the mid-16th century. These early collections, typically of blue-and-white ware, were regarded as rare curios and art objects, and were often mounted in precious metals.

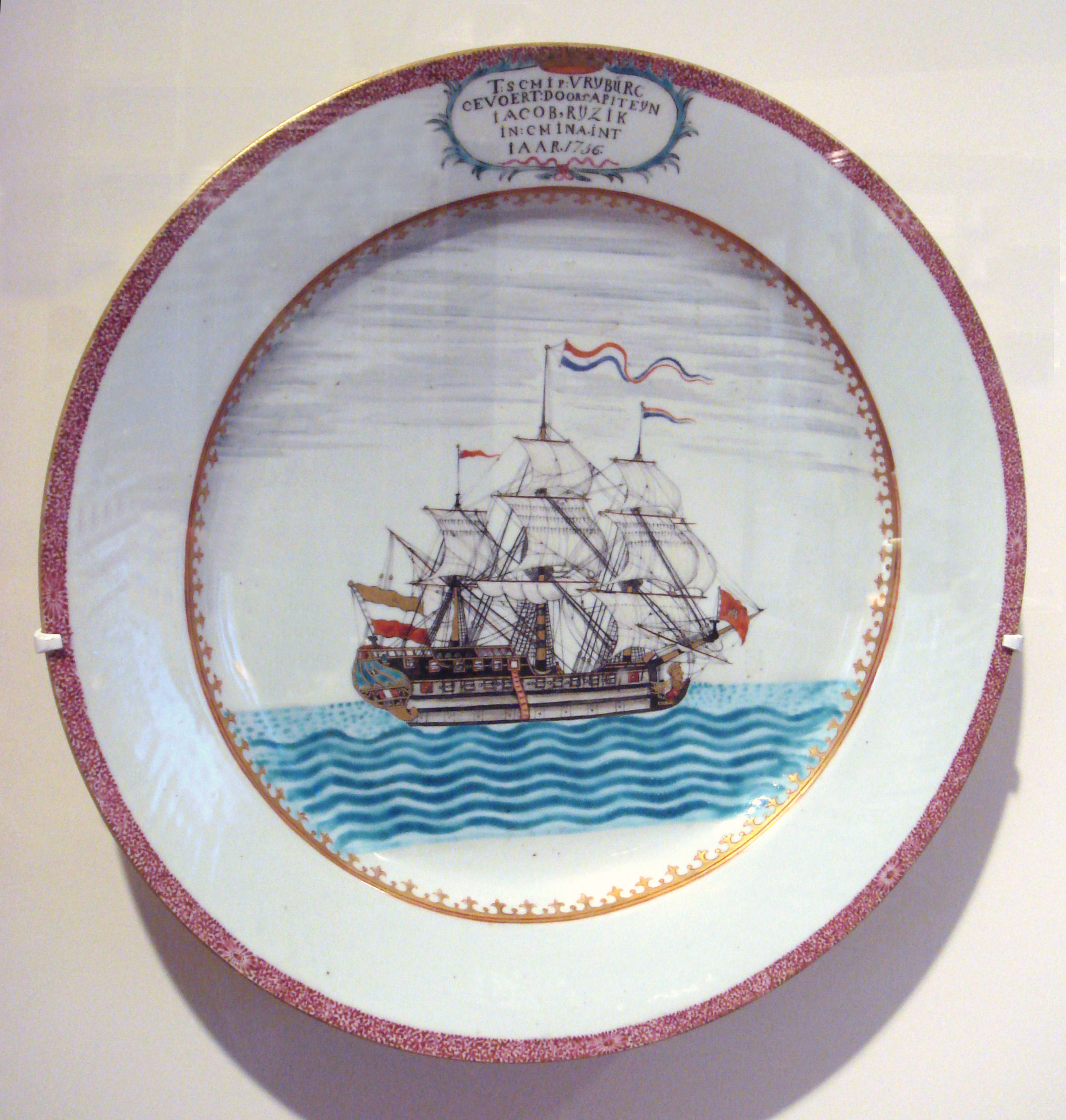
Chinese porcelain plate for a Dutch sea-captain of the ship Vryburg, Canton, 1756

Wares include Kraak porcelain, Swatow ware, transitional porcelain, armorial porcelain, Canton porcelain, and Chinese Imari, which were all largely or entirely made for export, as well as other types that were also sold to the domestic market. This group included Yixing stonewares, Blanc de Chine, blue and white porcelain, and famille verte, noire, jaune and rose. Chinese export porcelain was generally decorative, but without the symbolic significance of wares produced for the Chinese home market. Except for the rare Huashi soft paste wares, traditionally Chinese porcelain was made using kaolin and petuntse. While rim chips and hairline cracks are common, pieces tend not to stain. Chinese wares were usually thinner than those of the Japanese and did not have stilt marks.

In the 16th century, Portuguese traders began importing late Ming dynasty blue and white porcelains to Europe, resulting in the growth of the Kraak porcelain trade (named after the Portuguese ships called carracks in which it was transported). In 1602 and 1604, two Portuguese carracks, the San Yago and Santa Catarina, were captured by the Dutch and their cargos, which included thousands of items of porcelain, were sold off at an auction, igniting a European interest for porcelain. Buyers included the Kings of England and France.

After this, a number of European nations established companies trading with the countries of East Asia, the most significant for the porcelain being the Dutch East India Company or VOC. Between 1602 and 1682 the company carried between 30 and 35 million pieces of Chinese and Japanese export porcelain. The English East India Company also imported around 30 million pieces, the French East India Company 12 million, the Portuguese East India Company 10 million and the Swedish East India Company some 20 million pieces between 1766 and 1786.

The trade continued until the mid-17th century when the Ming dynasty fell in 1644, and civil war disrupted porcelain production. European traders then turned to Japanese export porcelain instead, though much of that was still traded through Chinese ports. However, the Chinese had reasserted their dominance by the 1740s.

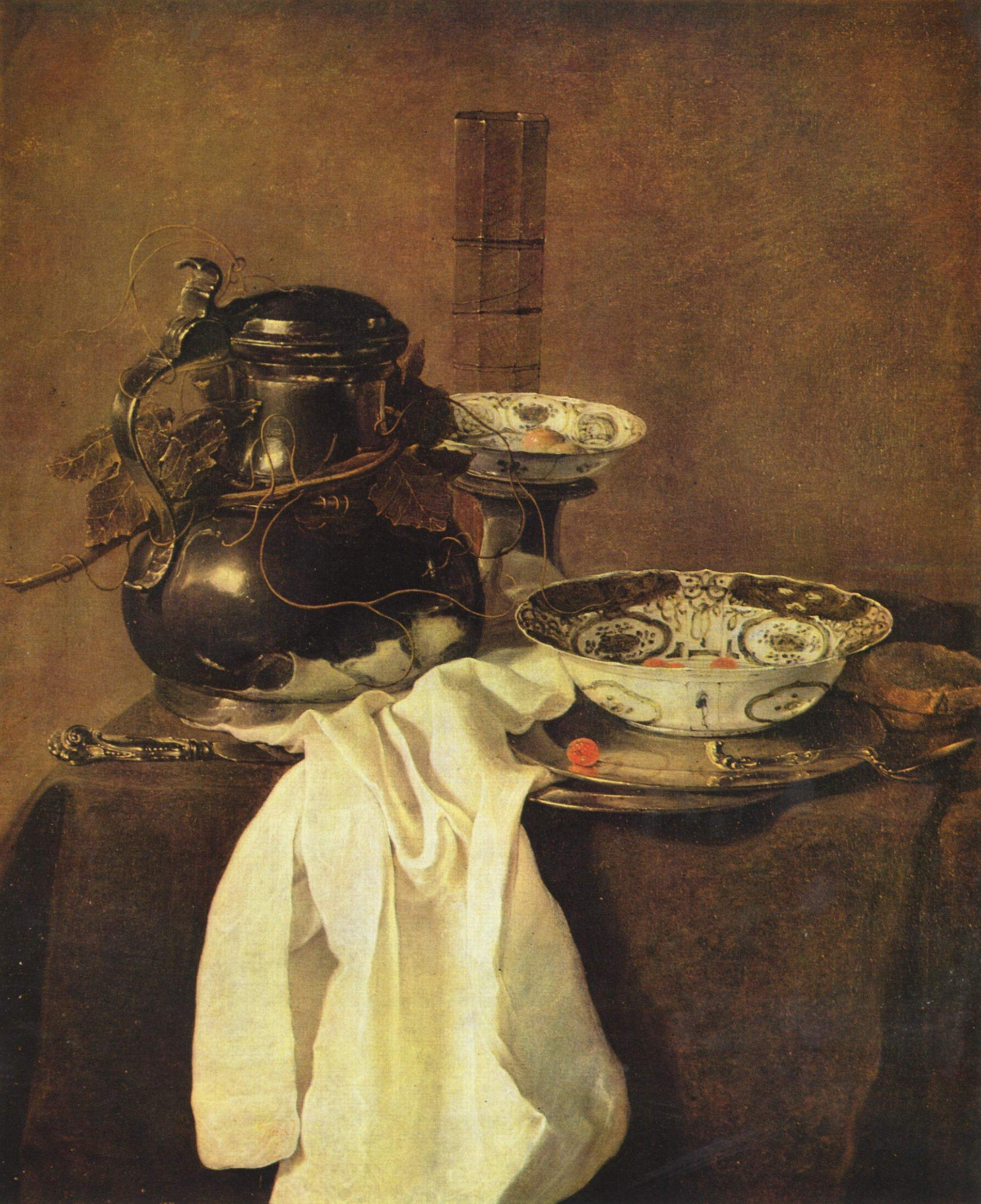
Dutch 17th-century still-life painting by Jan Jansz. Treck, showing late Ming blue and white porcelain export bowls, 1649

As valuable and highly prized possessions, pieces of Chinese export porcelain appeared in many 17th century Dutch paintings. A still life by Jan Jansz. Treck includes two Kraak-style bowls, probably late Ming, one in the foreground of a type the Dutch called klapmuts. The blue pigment used by the artist faded badly since the picture was painted.

Under the Kangxi Emperor's reign (1662–1722) the Chinese porcelain industry, now largely concentrated at Jingdezhen was reorganised and the export trade soon flourished again. Chinese export porcelain from the late 17th century included blue-and-white and famille verte wares (and occasionally famille noire and famille jaune). Wares included garnitures of vases, dishes, teawares, ewers, and other useful wares along with figurines, animals and birds. Blanc de Chine porcelains and Yixing stonewares arriving in Europe and gave inspiration to many European potters.

The massive increase in imports allowed purchasers to amass large collections, which were often displayed in dedicated rooms or purpose-built structures. The Trianon de Porcelaine built between 1670 and 1672 was a Baroque pavilion constructed to display Louis XIV's collection of blue-and-white porcelain, set against French blue-and-white faience tiles both on the interior and exterior of the building. It was demolished in 1687.

For the potters of Jingdezhen the manufacture of porcelain wares for the European export market presented new difficulties. Writing from the city in 1712, the French Jesuit missionary Père François Xavier d'Entrecolles records that "...the porcelain that is sent to Europe is made after new models that are often eccentric and difficult to reproduce; for the least defect they are refused by the merchants, and so they remain in the hands of the potters, who cannot sell them to the Chinese, for they do not like such pieces".

In the later 18th century, as European porcelain factories became established, there was more competition, and the quality of export wares declined, with many using fussy and over-elaborate shapes and decoration. So-called Canton porcelain was made as "blanks" at Jingdezhen, then carried to Canton (Guangzhou) where it was painted in styles designed for Western markets at the Thirteen Factories, often including armorial porcelain for dining wares, with the design of the coat of arms of the buyer sent out from Europe and copied.

== Wares and figurines ==
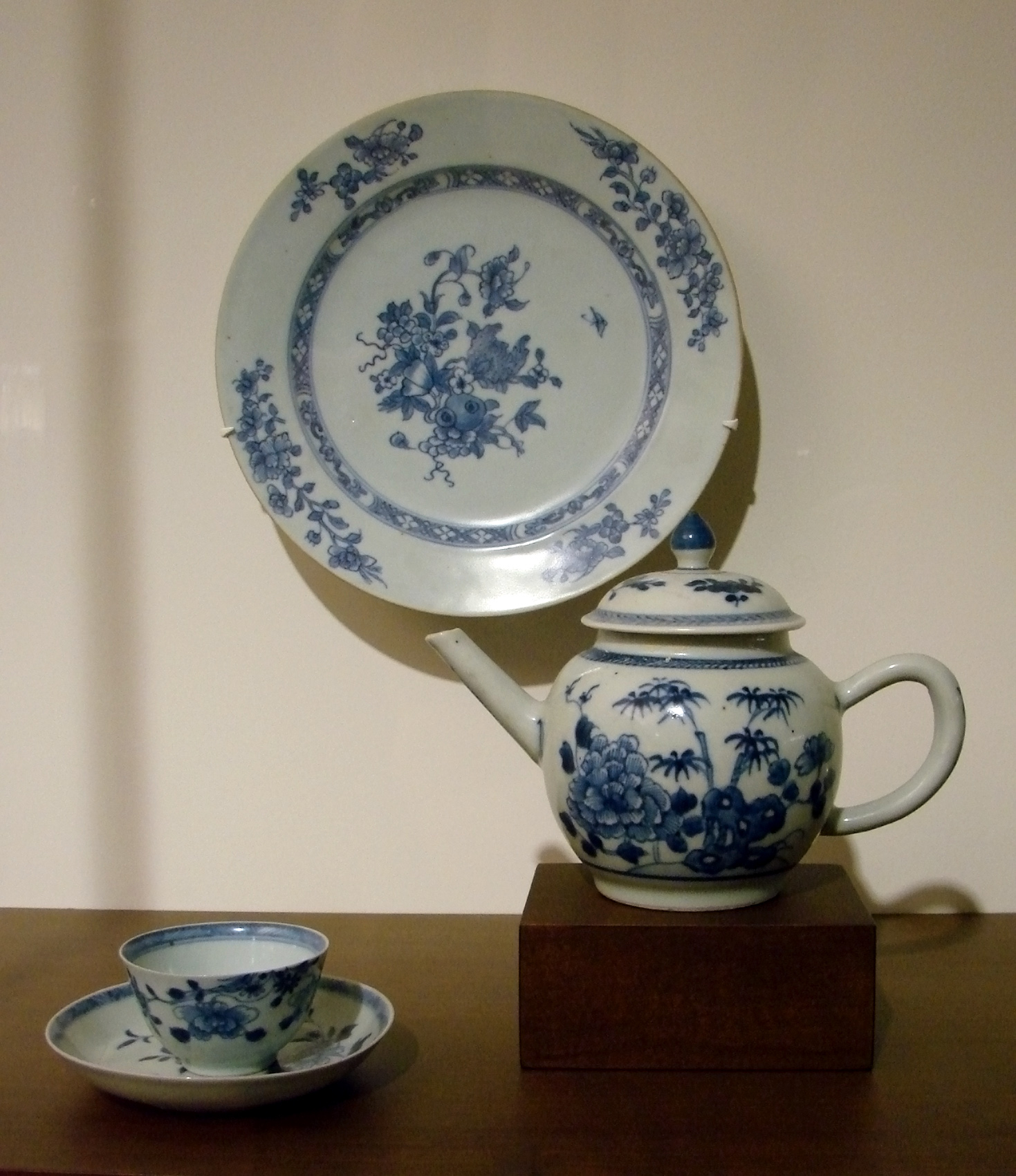
18th-century Chinese export porcelain, Guimet Museum, Paris

Although European crests on Chinese porcelain can be found on pieces made as early as the 16th century, around 1700 the demand for armorial porcelain increased dramatically. Thousands of services were ordered with drawings of individuals' coat of arms being sent out to China to be copied and shipped back to Europe and, from the late 18th century, to North America. Some were lavishly painted in polychrome enamels and gilding, while others, particularly later examples, might incorporate only a small crest or monogram in blue and white. Chinese potters copied the popular Japanese Imari porcelains, which continued to be made for export into the second half of the 18th century, examples being recovered as part of the Nanjing cargo from the shipwreck of the Geldermalsen.

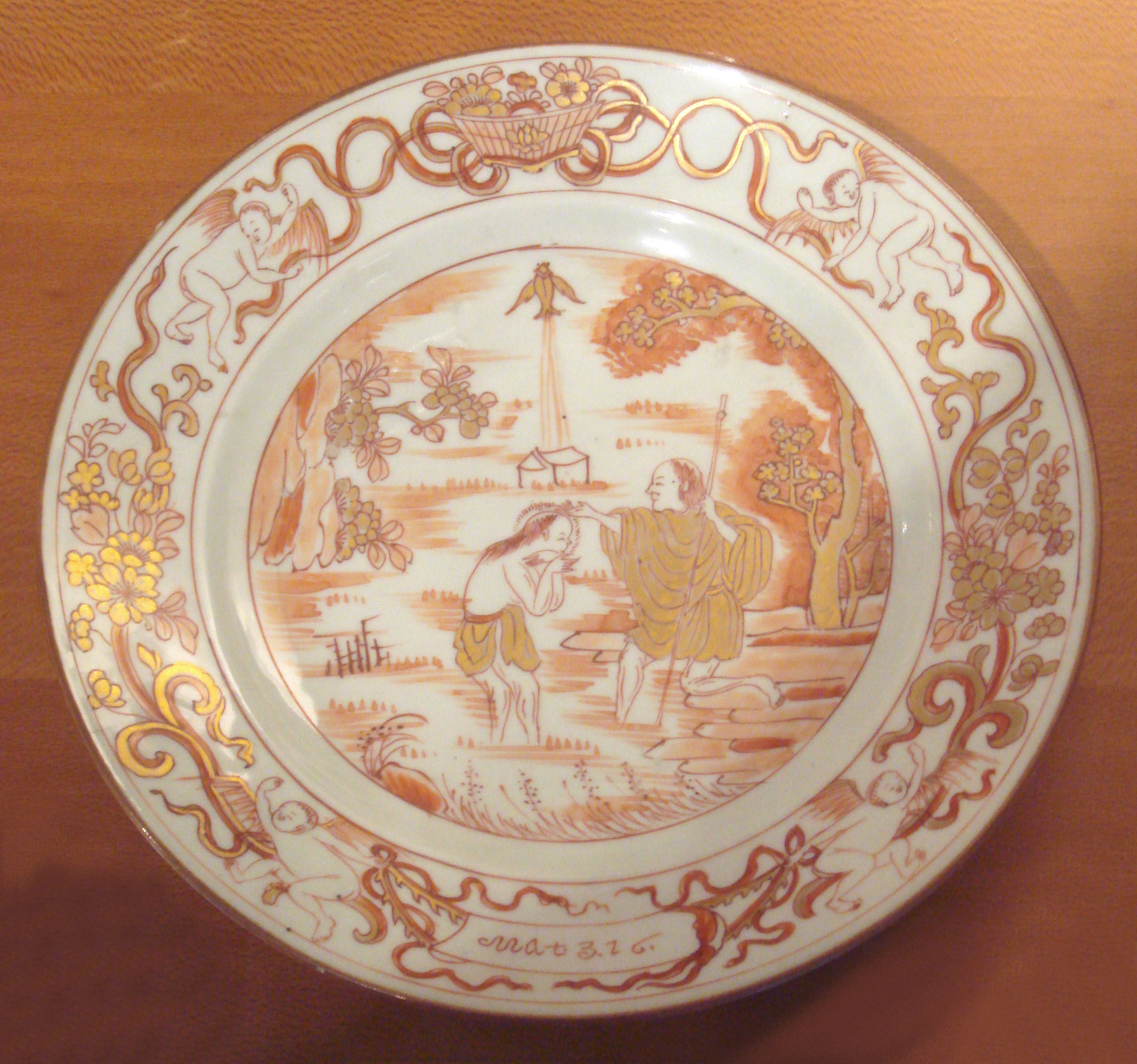
Qing export porcelain with European Christian scene, 1725–1735

A wide variety of shapes, some of Chinese or Islamic origin, others copying faience or metalwork were made. Oriental figurines included Chinese gods and goddesses such as Guanyin (the goddess of mercy) and Budai (the god of contentment), figurines with nodding heads, seated monks and laughing boys as well as figurines of Dutch men and women. From the mid-18th century, even copies of Meissen figurines such as Tyrolean dancers were made for export to Europe. Birds and animals, including cows, cranes, dogs, eagles, elephants, pheasants, monkeys and puppies, were popular.

From around 1720, the new famille rose palette was adopted and quickly supplanted the earlier famille verte porcelains of the Kangxi period. Famille rose enamels for the export market included the Mandarin Palette. Specific patterns such as tobacco leaf and faux tobacco leaf were popular as were, from around 1800, Canton decorated porcelain with its figures and birds, flowers and insects. Many other types of decoration such as encre de chine or Jesuit wares, made for Christian missionaries. One significant and diverse group of export wares is those with European subject designs copied from Western prints taken out to China. Well known examples include the Judgement of Paris, the Baptism of Christ and many others with portraits, mythological scenes, pastoral scenes, topographical views and literary and anecdotal images. About a thousand such 'European subject' designs are known from the long 18th century. Many of the original print sources have been identified though many remain to be found. The Arms of Liberty Punch Bowl was a political type using decoration from prints that had appeal to American nationalists and British radicals. Other examples include the Sydney punchbowls from the Macquarie era in Australia, 1810–1820.

== Later trade ==
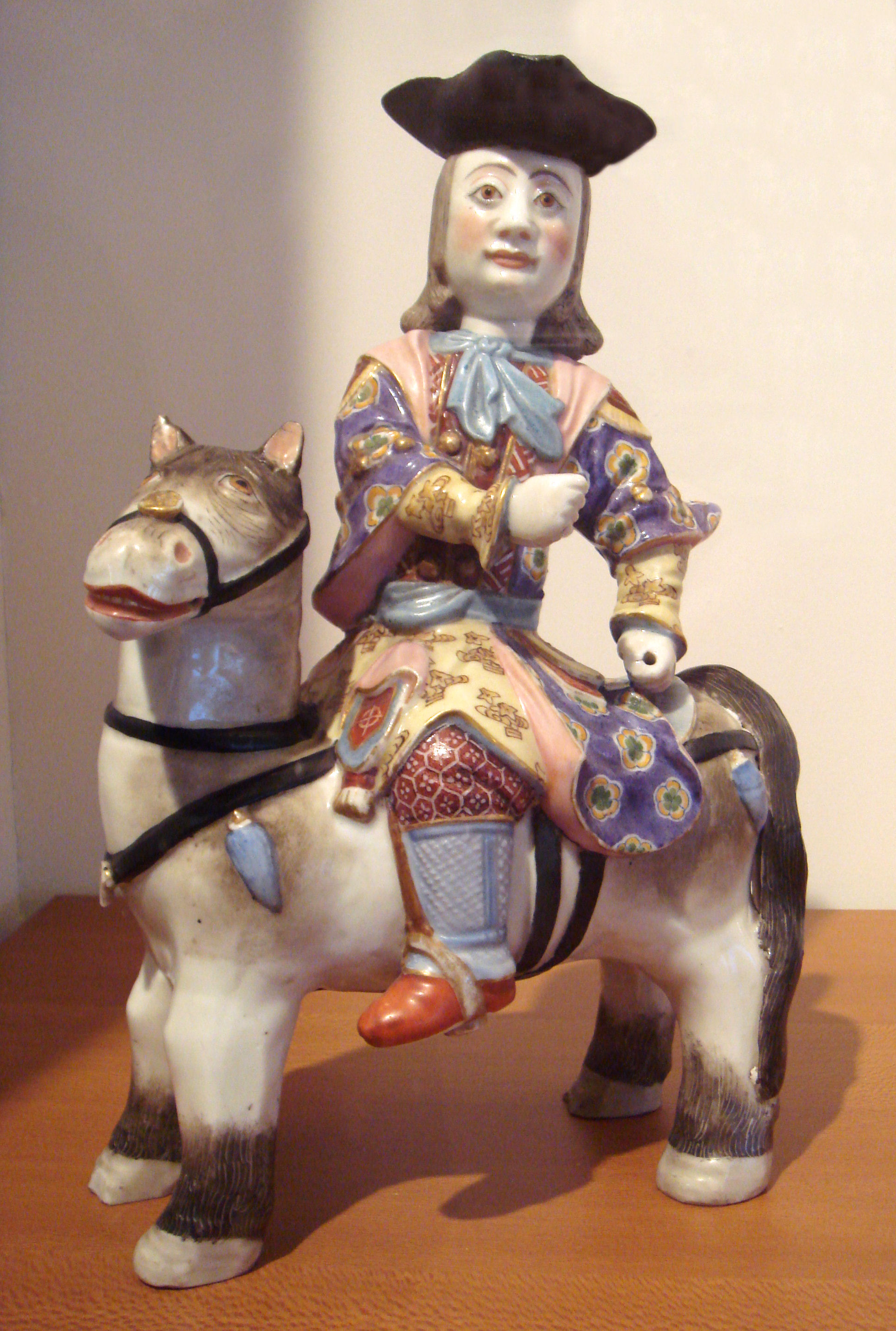
Qing export porcelain with European figure, famille rose, first half of the 18th century

As trade with China developed, finer quality wares were shipped by private traders who rented space on the ships of the companies trading with the country. The bulk export wares of the 18th century were typically teawares and dinner services, often blue and white decorated with flowers, pine, prunus, bamboo or with pagoda landscapes, a style that inspired the willow pattern. They were sometimes clobbered (enamelled) in the Netherlands and England to enhance their decorative appeal. By the late 18th century, imports from China had declined due to changing tastes and competition from new European factories, which used mass-production.

Highly decorative Canton porcelain was produced throughout the 19th century, but the quality of wares waned. By the end of the century, blue and white wares in the Kangxi style were produced in large quantities and almost every earlier style and type was copied into the 20th century.

In modern times, historic Chinese export porcelain is popular with the international fine arts market, though recently less so than wares made for the domestic market. In 2016, collections were auctioned for tens of millions USD, through companies such as Sotheby's and Christie's.

In recent decades, modern porcelain production for export, mainly of basic household wares in contemporary styles, has increased enormously and once again become an important industry for China. Production of imitations of historic wares also continues.

== Gallery ==
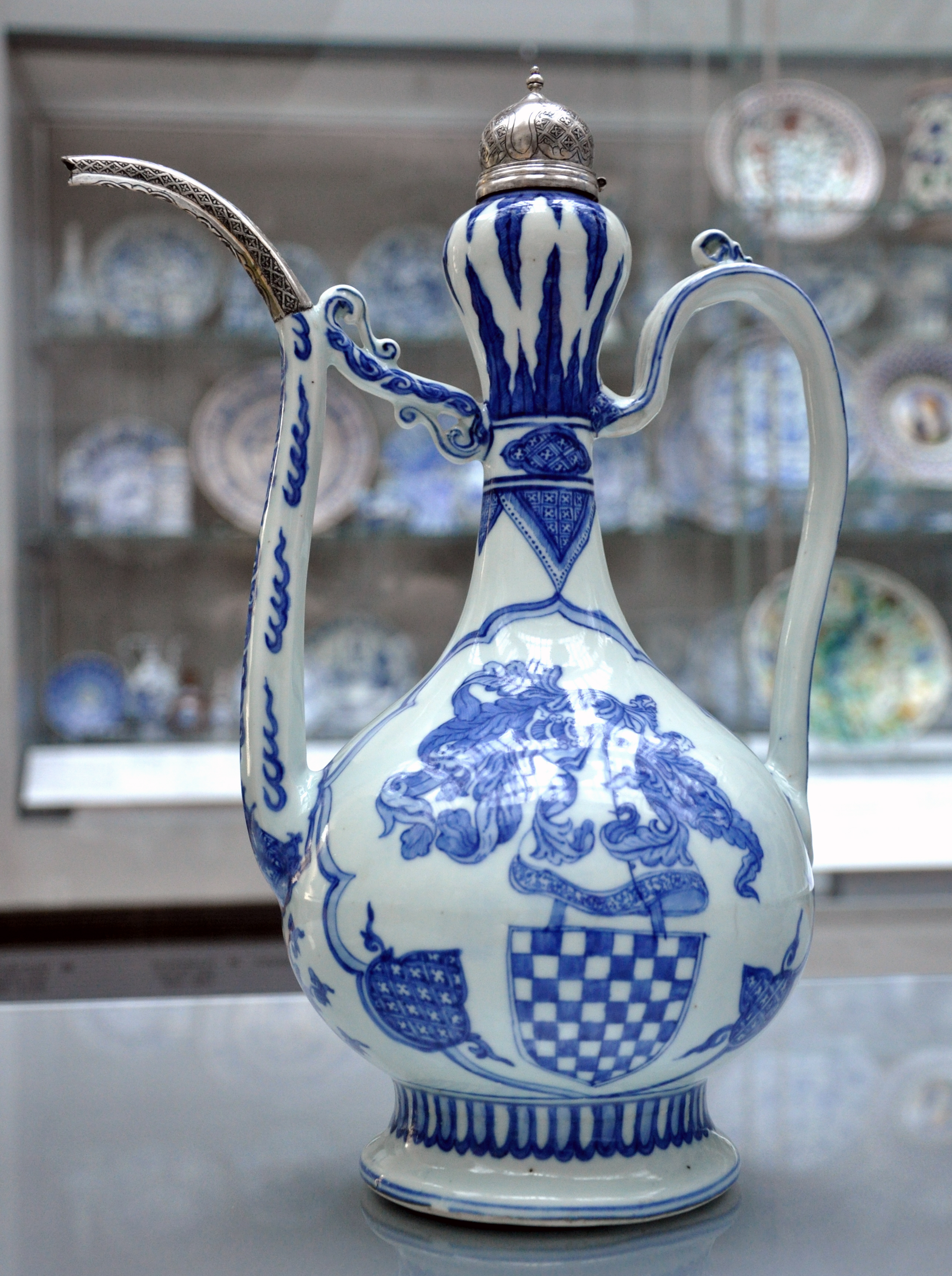
Jingdezhen porcelain ewer, in an Islamic shape, with the arms of a Portuguese family, c. 1522–1566

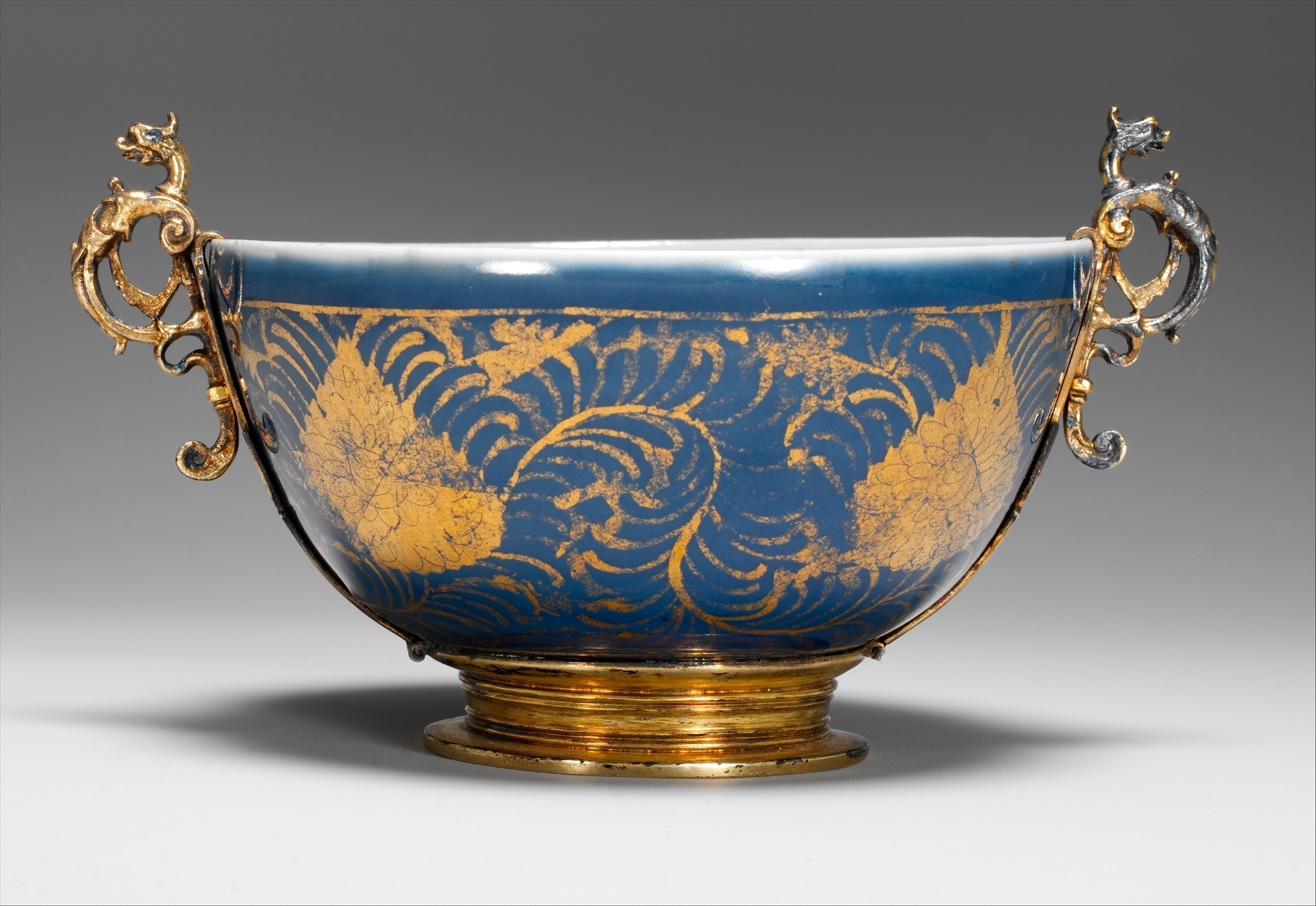
Jingdezhen porcelain with English silver-gilt mount, 1590–1610

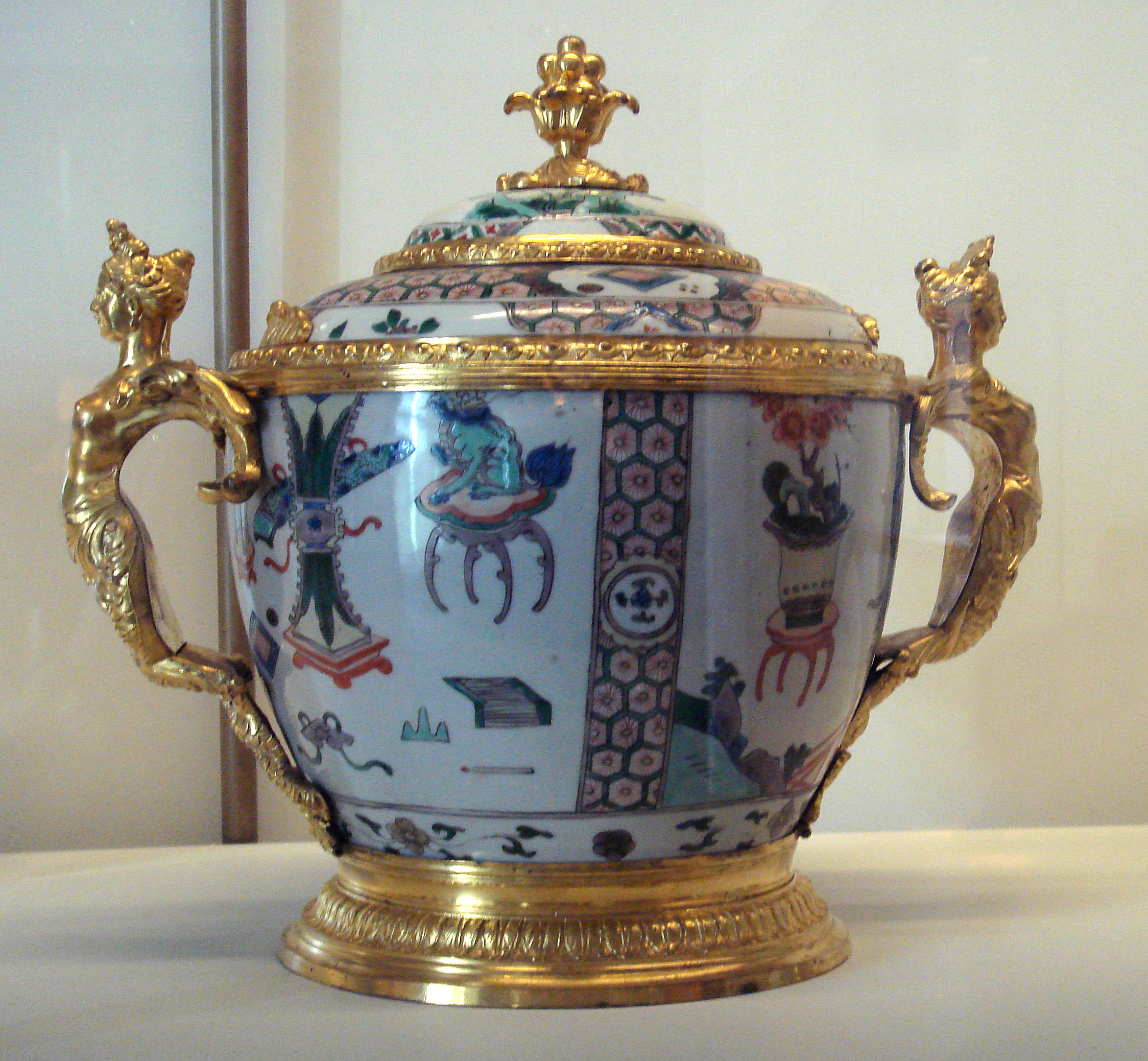
Kangxi porcelain adorned with French gilt-bronze mounts, 1710–1720

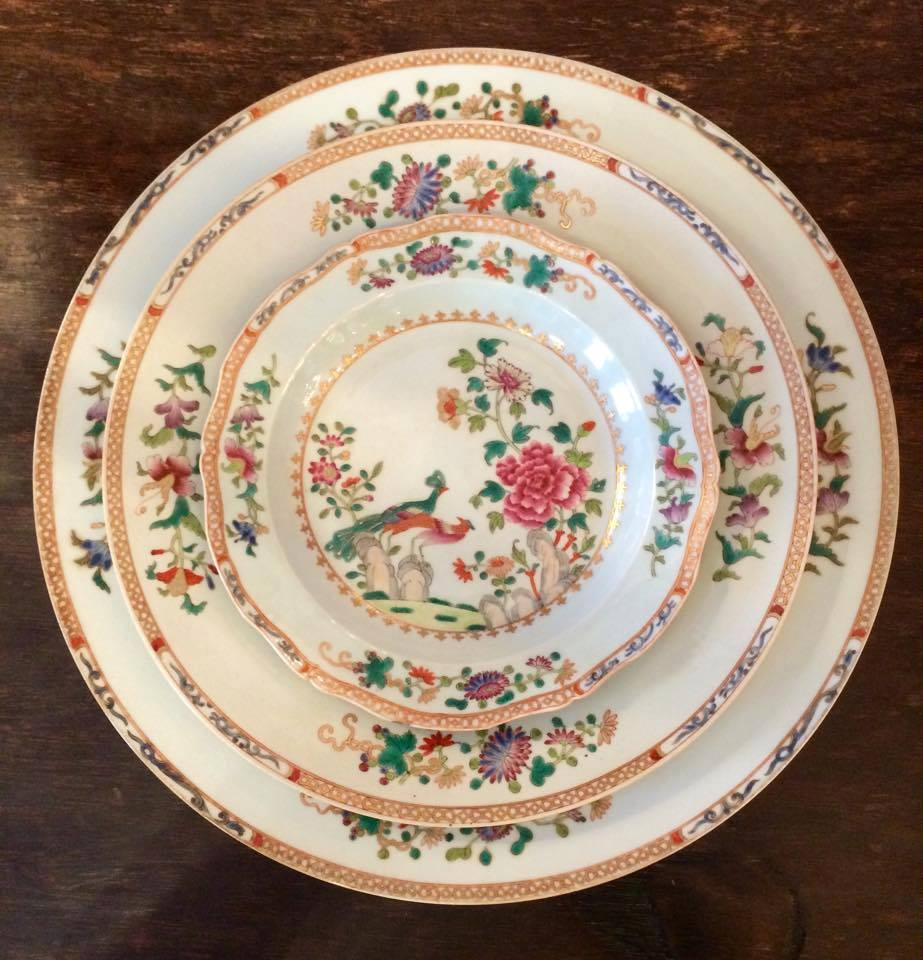
A set of medallion, rice dish, and dinner plate of the Double Peacock Dinner Service, famille rose

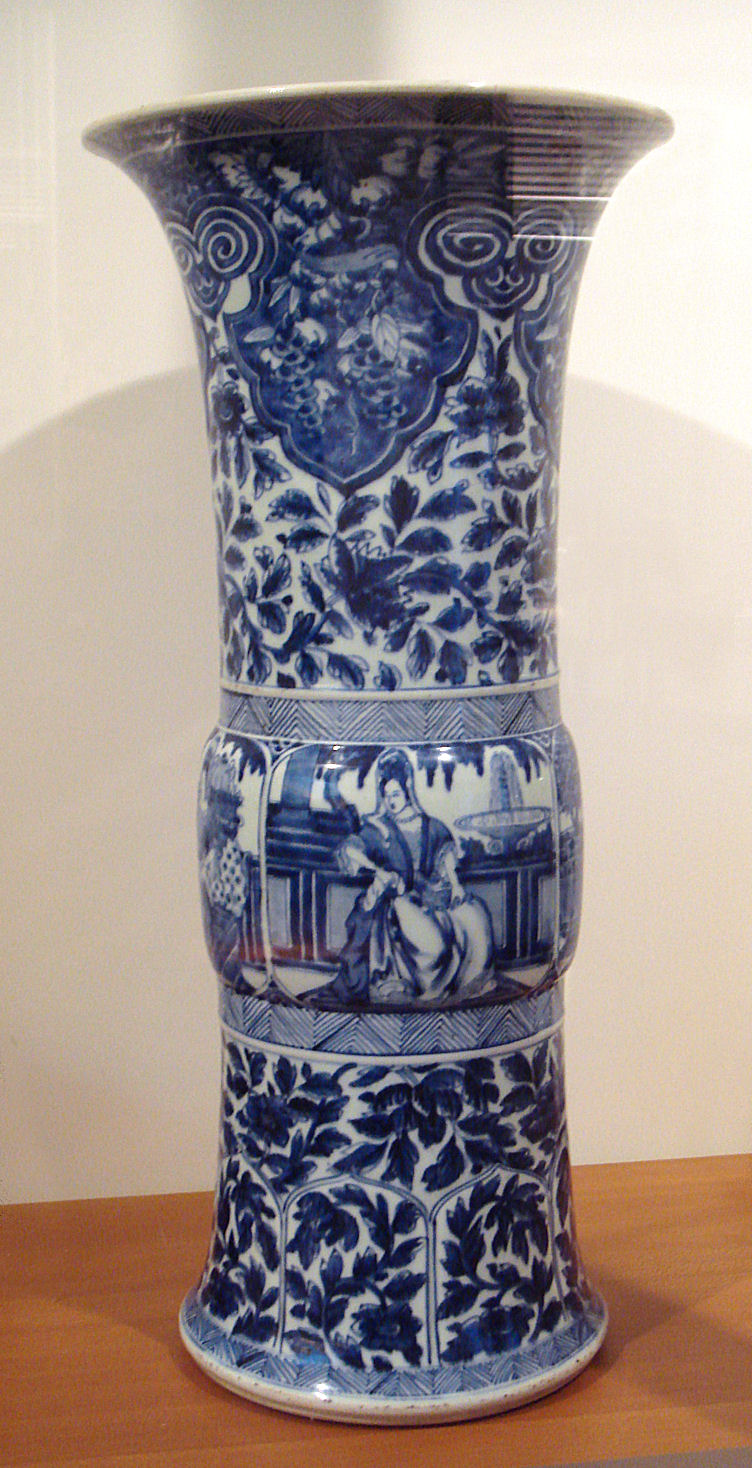
Export porcelain vase with a European scene, Kangxi period

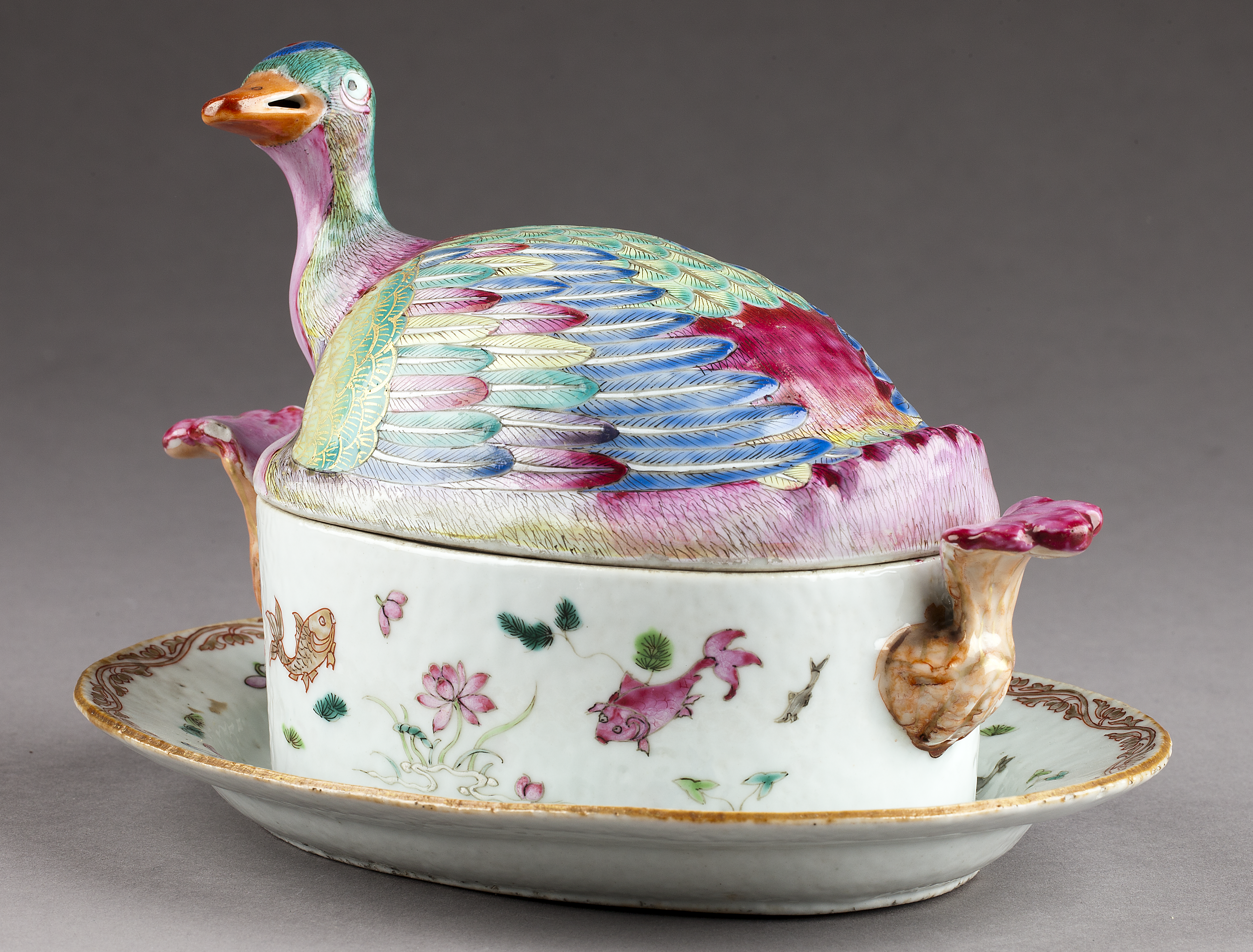
Porcelain tureen and tray with lid shaped like a mandarin duck, decorated in overglaze enamels and gilding, Qing dynasty, c. 1750–1760

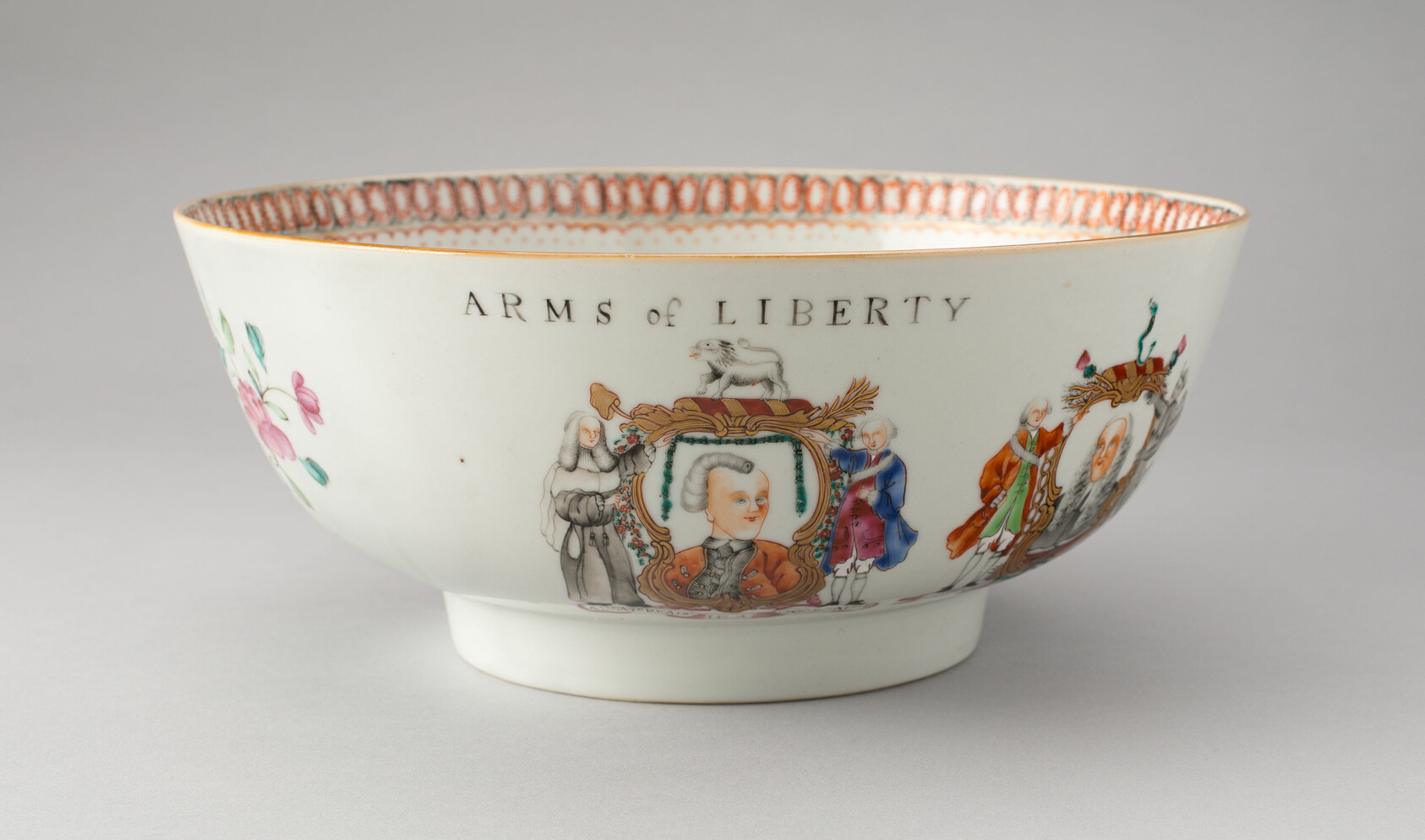
Arms of Liberty Punch Bowl c. 1769

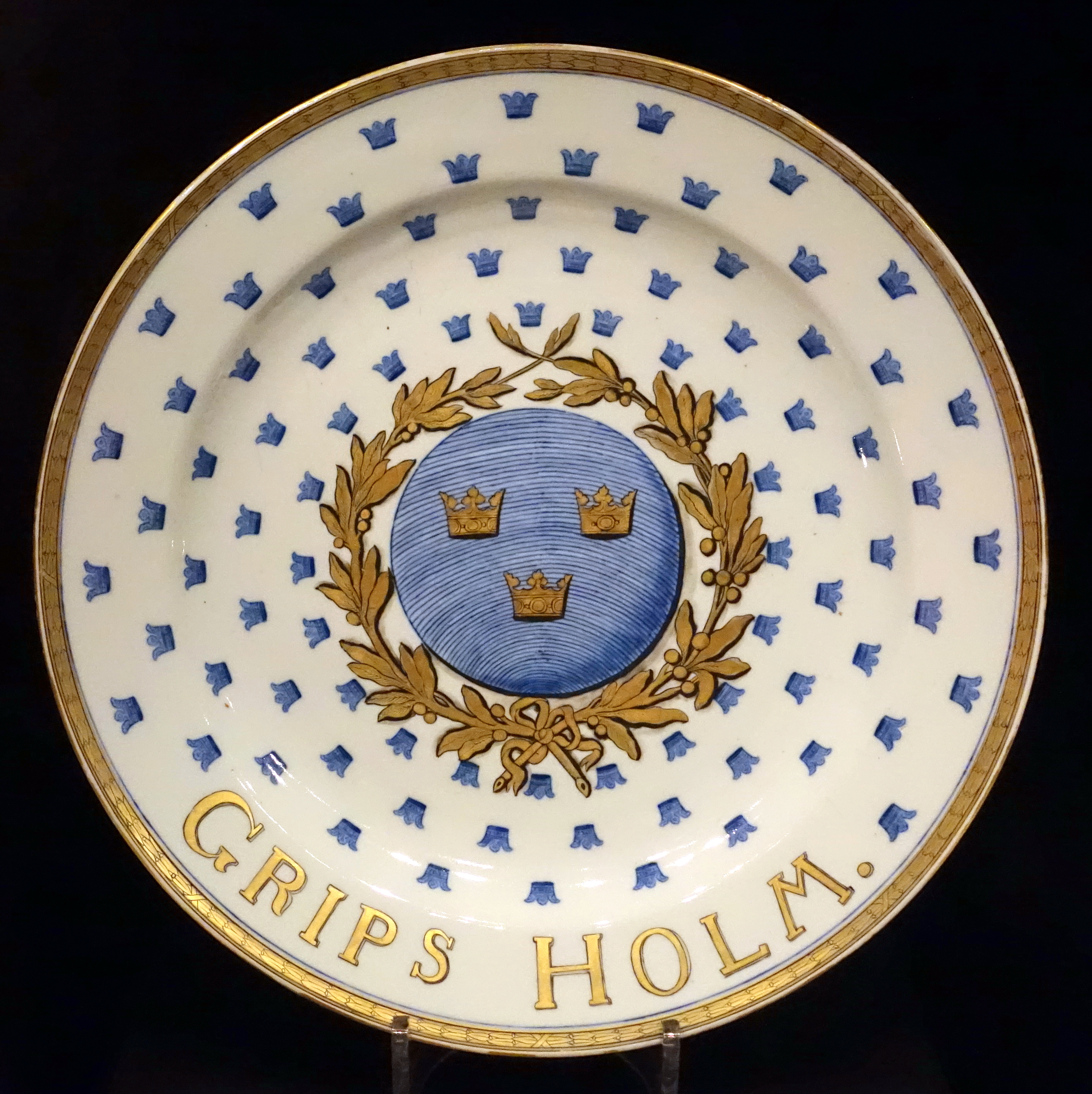
Plate from the armorial Gripsholm Service, for Sweden, c. 1776

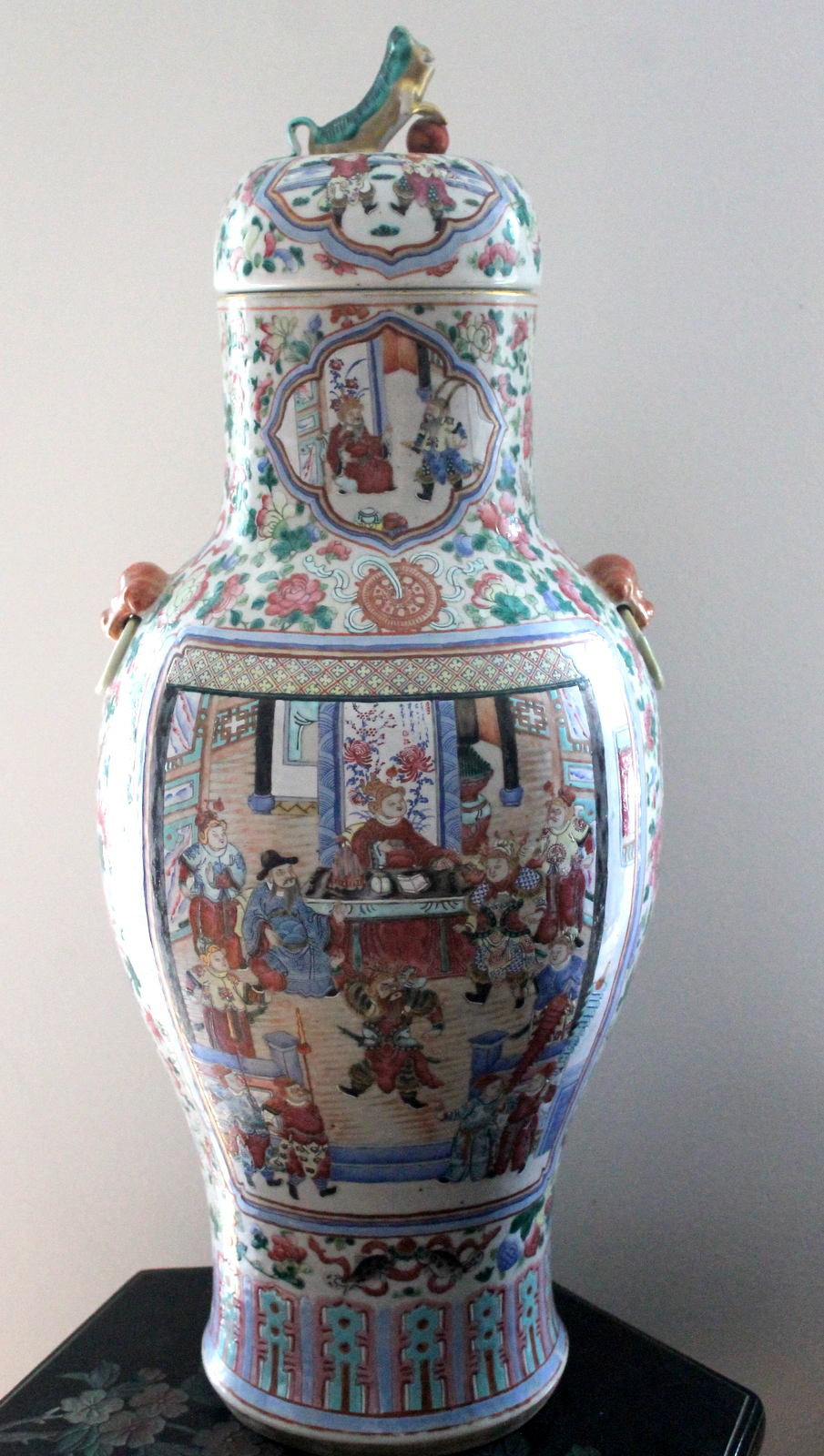
19th century porcelain vase with cover painted with overglaze enamels and gilding Canton or Guangdong province, in southern China. This type of ware, known for its colourful decoration that covers most of the surface of the piece, was popular as an export ware. On the backside of the porcelain vase a military general depicted in front of a walled city gate has a banner with the surname "Ma". Romance of the Three Kingdoms

== See also ==
- Japanese export porcelain
- Chinese export silver
- Porcelain trade in Qing China
- Economic history of China before 1912
