= Chinese export silver =

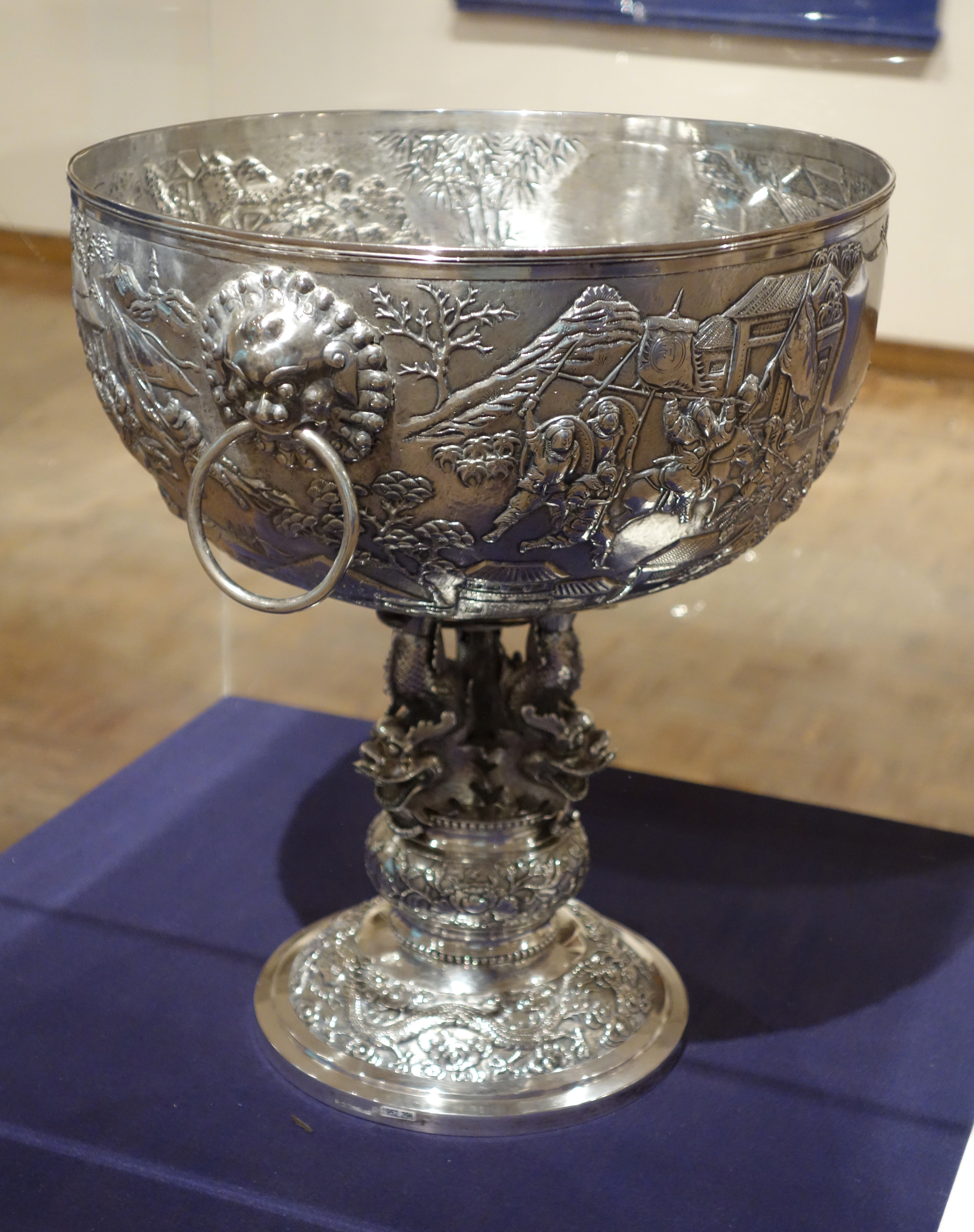
Exhibit in the Huntington Museum of Art, Huntington, West Virginia, USA

Chinese export silver is silverware made in China for export, mainly to Europe. It is analogous to the much larger production of Chinese export porcelain, but unlike this remained largely confined to ornamental objects rather than practical tableware. In the eighteenth and nineteenth centuries, through the Chinese Canton System (Canton Port) and after that, the opium war, the Treaty of Nanking and Treaty of Tientsin, Qing dynasty China became a major exporter for fine Chinese goods such as tea, spices and porcelain etc. to Europe, Germany, France, Russia and America and north Africa. The Treaty trading ports were further extended throughout the entire Qing Dynasty's land.

Historically, silver has been more valuable in China than Europe, relative to gold and other commodities, and European traders had for centuries paid for their purchases of Chinese goods with silver. Now for the first time, price levels made the importation of silver objects made for export to Europe attractive. Though the Chinese government had for centuries been content to see renewable or inexhaustible luxury products such as silk or ceramics leave China as trade goods or diplomatic gifts, they had tried to retain as much silver as possible in China. Now they were unable to do this.

Just as the Chinese potters produced Chinese export porcelain for Western consumers, Chinese silversmiths also created elaborately decorated objects for international clients. Early works of Chinese Export Silver was intended to reproduce or copy objects in European styles. However, in copying the European style or model objects, the Chinese artisans later managed to add to new decorations such Chinese motifs as the dragon, flowers, bamboo and scenes of life at the Chinese court. Blending Western forms with Asian decoration including dragons, bamboo, and Chinese landscapes, these pieces reflect the long-standing cultural and commercial exchange between East and West.

== History ==
Most of them were loaded at Shanghai and Tientsin. At the end of the 16th century, regular trade with the West had indeed been going on since the time of the Roman Empire when China was known as Seres - the land of Silk. The Portuguese had established the first "modern" trading station in China as early as 1514. In the 18th century western artists started to make up decorative items and whole interiors in a mock Chinese or Japanese style. These Western "Chinoiserie" designs became an important element of the arts and styles of the mid 18th century.

From the late 18th century to the first quarter of the 19th, as the export trade increased, so did the demand from Europe for familiar, utilitarian forms. European forms such as mugs, ewers, tazza, and candlesticks were unknown in China so models were sent to the Chinese silversmith to be copied. Chinese silversmiths basically made these objects completely based on prototypes from England and America. Common items were tea and coffee sets, spoon, forks, trays and other flat wares.

From the second quarter of the 19th century onward, Chinese forms and decoration became popular. In late 19th century, Chinese silversmiths added Chinese motifs such as the dragon and phoenix and scenes of life at the Chinese court.

== Chinese Silver "Hallmarks" ==
During the early Chinese Export Silver Period, silversmiths faithfully copied functional British or American items like flatware, tankards, and tea sets. Since they did not understand the significance of British silver hallmarks, they often unwittingly copied them as well, but with crude symbols or altered lettering. Some of the earlier known Chinese Export Silver makers' chopped mark are: We We WC and Cutshing.

Because of the way it often was marked, most Chinese Export silver is not easy for the average collector to identify, and can be confused with silver made in England or early 19th-century America. The small chopped or marks found on items of Chinese Export Silver are not hallmarks. Hallmarks are small markings stamped on the object that indicates that an official (usually a local assayer) in a particular country guarantees that the item is made from a certain percentage of silver. There is actually no assay system in Chinese China. We can only describe these small marking as marker's mark. It represents the firm producing the Silver. Some are in Chinese character while others are in alphabets.
