= Porcelain trade of the Qing dynasty =

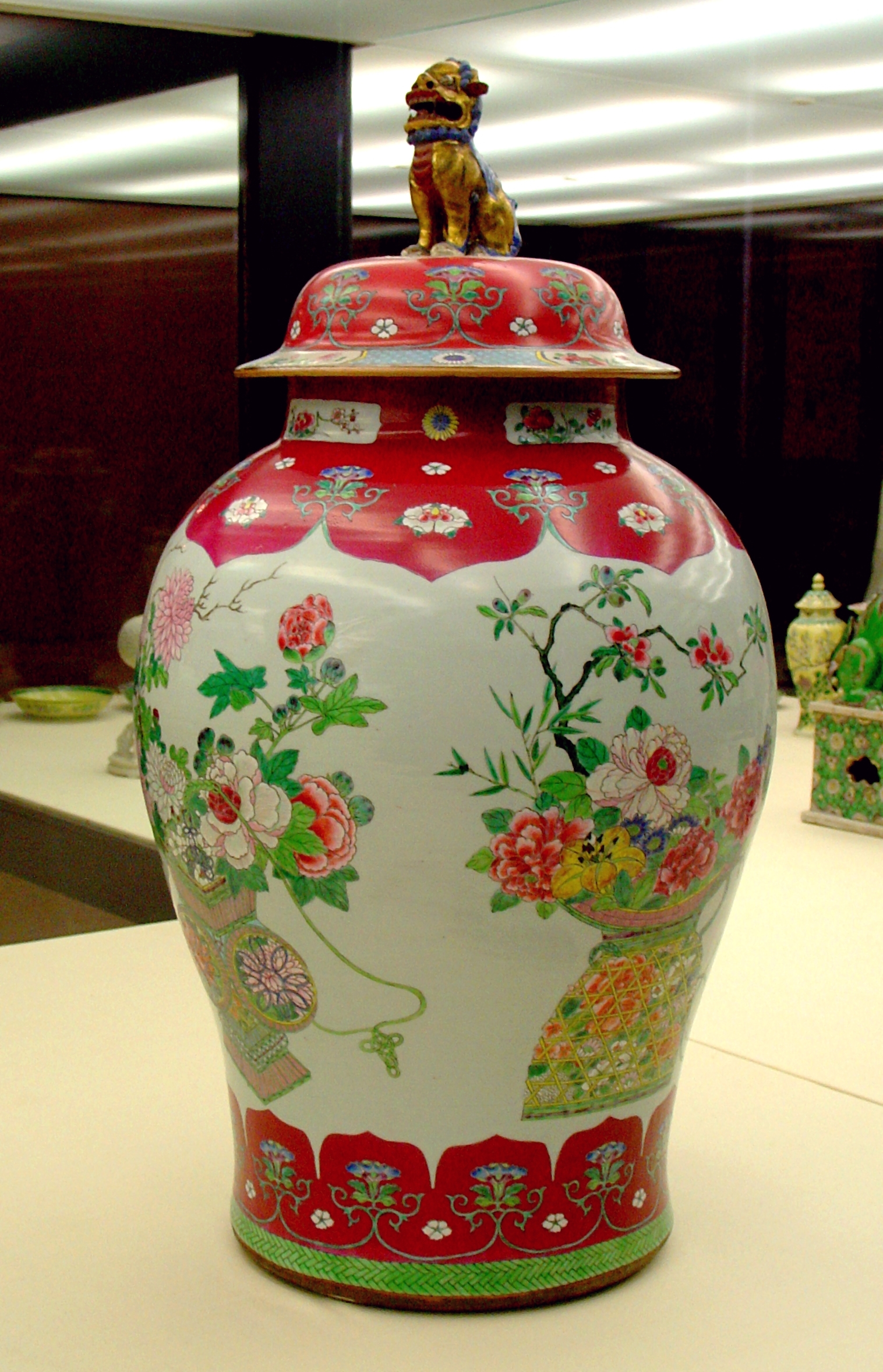
Qing dynasty porcelain vase, with five different enamels & glaze developed during the period.

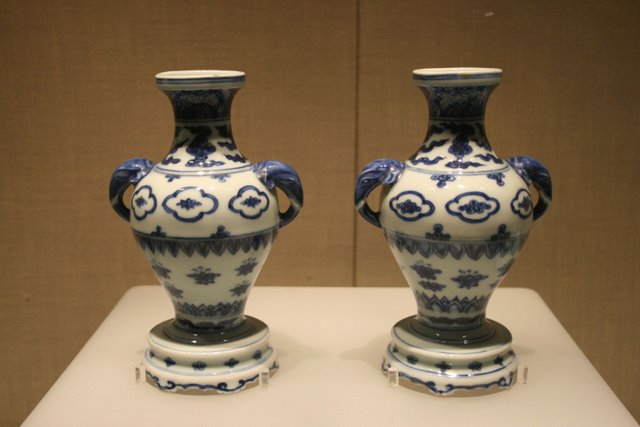
Earlier Ming porcelain was slightly dull due to its less advanced technique. It was fired at a lower temperature and typically had only two colors.

The porcelain trade became important during the late Ming dynasty and was so throughout the Qing dynasty. The growth reflected a creative influence that improved the artistic design of the porcelain and generated high demand in Europe.

Chinese porcelain made specifically for export to Europe is known as Chinese export porcelain.

== Economic trade ==
In the late Ming dynasty many kilns were manufactured which led the Ming economy. The later emperors of the Ming dynasty like Jiajing and Wanli built more kilns in Jingdezhen. There was more research on materials and techniques for the manufacture of porcelain during the Qing dynasty. The high demand caused the Ming to realize that they needed to properly allocate and manage funds to establish a steady porcelain supply. The additional kilns and management helped the production of porcelain and growth during the early Qing dynasty. However, when the Ming Dynasty ended, suffering occurred during the Qing dynasty when Jingdezhen became a prime location for political turmoil and military campaigns during the Taiping Rebellion. These invasions temporarily stalled the manufacture of porcelain.

Once the Qing dynasty restored the porcelain trade they developed a more efficient way to transport porcelain goods. The Qing emperors like Kangxi helped increase maritime trade which aided the growth of porcelain trade. By using the Yangtze River not only were porcelain materials cheaper to ship but the final product could be transported to otherwise inaccessible regions. Kangxi improved porcelain trade by encouraging private maritime trade by families with private kilns. Once again the porcelain trade was thriving, and helped to boost the economy of the early Qing empire.

== Porcelain quality ==
There is a difference in the way Qing porcelain was created and why its trade thrived. The Ming, prior to their overthrow by the Qing, used two color glazes on their porcelain. The two-color porcelain was sought by European connoisseurs, but eventually demand slumped. Once the Qing came to power they began to change the artistic design of the porcelain, and experimented with techniques to use five colors. The Qing focused on artistic elements like the use of color and firing at a higher temperature to get a glossier finish. Many of the private kilns trusted their potters with creative freedom. A more creative porcelain piece would bring more profit and boost the Qing economy.

Research on improved techniques for the production of porcelain goods stimulated the porcelain market in Jingdezhen (the porcelain capital of China). The various kilns and the changes of temperature produced a brilliance and assortment of porcelain that helped the Qing economy to thrive. Emperor Kangxi's decision to rebuild the kilns after the rebellion also benefited the Qing economy. The development of color techniques persisted into the Kangxi emperor's dynasty, and further showcased the Qing culture through the artful prints and designs on the porcelain. The same coloring and techniques are still used currently because no substitute has been found for the color and appearance of Qing porcelain.

== See also ==
- Chinese ceramics
- Chinese export porcelain
