= Arms of Liberty Punch Bowl =

18th-century Chinese punch bowl type commemorating John Wilkes

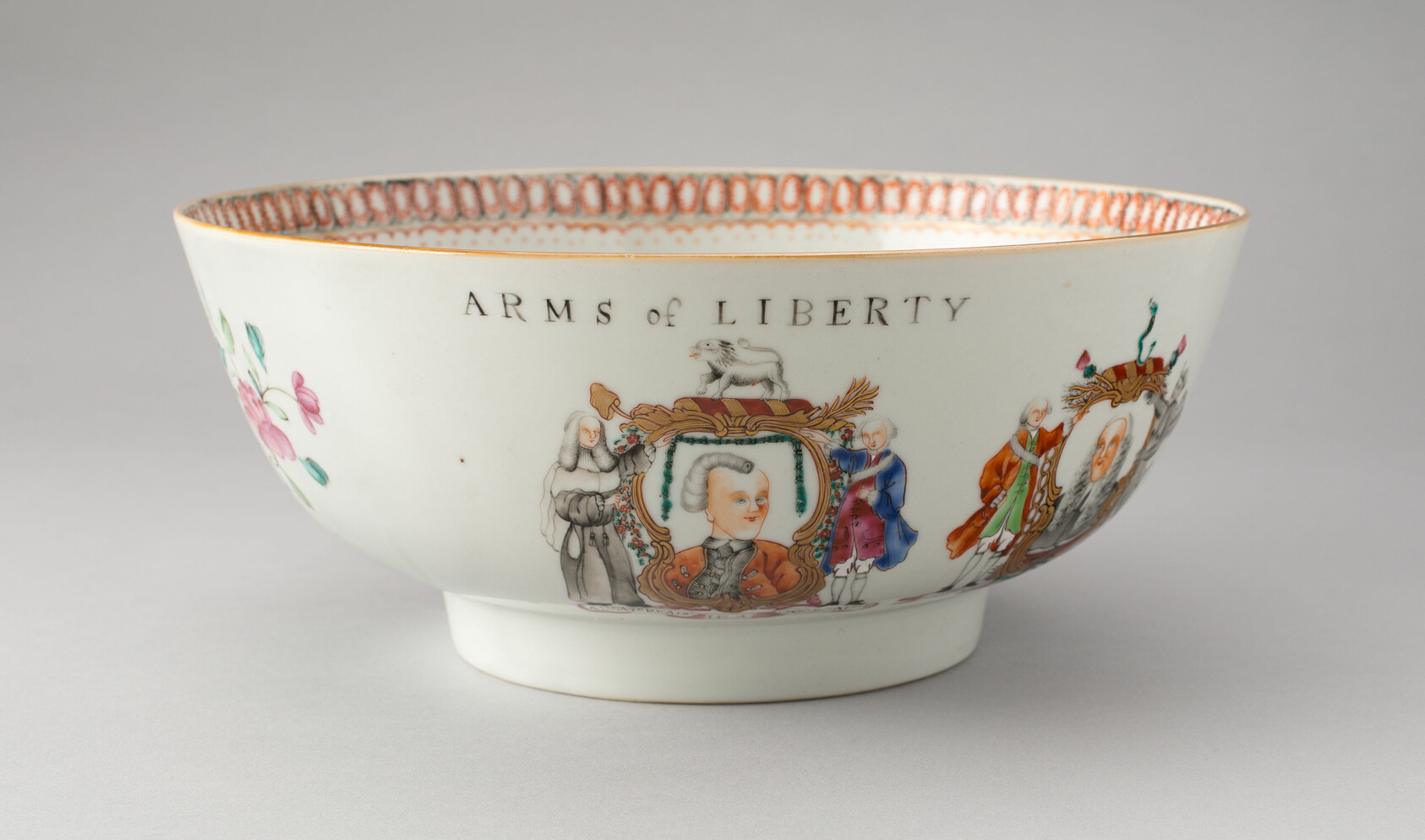
- Type: Jingdezhen ware: Chinese export porcelain
- Material: Hard-paste porcelain, glaze, with enamels in colors, and gilding
- Height: 11.5 cm (4.5 in)
- Width: 26.4 cm (10.4 in)
- Created: Jingdezhen, 1769–1775
- Period/culture: Qianlong era, Qing Dynasty
- Place: Art Institute of Chicago
- Culture: Chinese, British, American
- https://www.artic.edu/artworks/7830/punch-bowl

The Arms of Liberty Punch Bowl is a type of Chinese export porcelain punch bowls made for the British and Thirteen Colonies markets from 1769 to 1775. Produced in Jingdezhen, China, the bowls depict a caricature of John Wilkes and William Murray, 1st Earl of Mansfield, side by side in opposition. Made during a time of revolutionary fervor leading up to the American Revolution, the bowls saw popularity amongst American Patriots, British reformists, and radicals.

== Background ==
Throughout the 1760s, the English politician and writer John Wilkes was known for the publication of The North Briton, a radical newspaper which criticized the policies of George III's prime minister, John Stuart, 3rd Earl of Bute, with tinges of anti-Jacobite and Anti-Scottish sentiment.

Such episodes during his time as a Member of Parliament for Aylesbury, sparked considerable commotion, and even though the Earl of Bute was replaced by George Grenville, Wilkes maintained his criticisms, with The North Briton's 45th issue on 23 April 1763, was seen as a direct attack on the monarchy as well as the ministers, resulting in Wilkes' arrest. With claims of the invalidity of the arrest warrant, and Wilkes' claims of parliamentary privilege and technicality that he was not charged on oath, he was released. After the House of Commons revoked the protections of parliamentary privilege on "libel", resulting in Wilkes going on a four-year exile.

On his return in 1768, he attempted to contest the City of London seat, but on 28 March 1768, he defeated the incumbent of the Middlesex seat. During that time, he was arrested an served a sentence of 22 months at King's Bench Prison, though he maintained populist support.

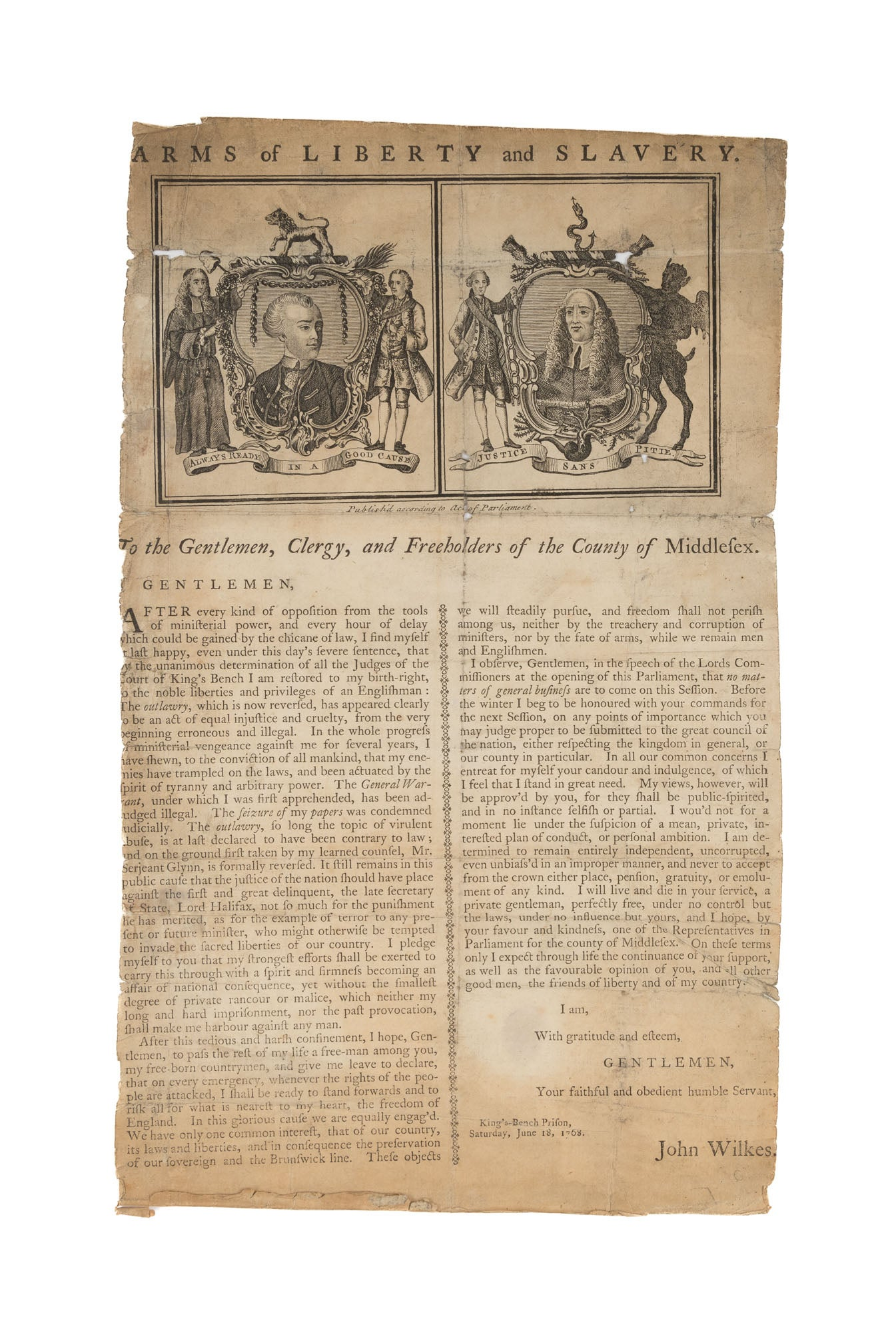
The Arms of Liberty Broadside, 18 June 1768

== The Punch Bowl ==
On 14 June 1768, he was sentenced to the 22 months in prison by Judge William Murray, 1st Earl of Mansfield. Four days into his sentence, he published a broadside entitled "Arms of Liberty and Slavery: to the Gentlemen, Clergy, and Freeholders of the County of Middlesex" mocking the Earl of Mansfield (flanked by Lord Bute and the Devil) with the motto "Justice Sans Pitie", with a caricature of Wilkes supported by his allies John Glynn and Richard Grenville-Temple, 2nd Earl Temple with the motto "Always Ready in a Good Cause". The broadside describes Wilkes' accusation of mistreatment, pointing a finger at George Montagu-Dunk, 2nd Earl of Halifax, who signed his 1763 arrest warrant, and promised loyalty to his constituents in Middlesex.

At the time Chinese export porcelain was a common import throughout Europe, and although politics was seldom a subject on the wares, the popularity of Wilkes brought a market demand for merchandise between the American Thirteen Colonies and the British population with his likeness sold on prints and ceramics, both export and domestic markets alike.

From 1769 to 1775, the Jingdezhen porcelain kilns reproduced the portrait from the broadside onto the punch bowls, using the famille rose colors in yangcai (洋彩) style, a process oversawn by Tang Ying during the Qianlong period. Engraved in polychromed enamel with gilding, are the portraits of Wilkes and the Lord of Mansfield from the broadside, with the portrait of Wilkes flanked by his associates, and Lord Mansfield flanked by the Devil and George III. As in the broadside, Wilkes maintains the "Always Ready in a Good Cause" and Lord Mansfield maintains the "Justice Sans Pitie" mottos. Above the portrait of Wilkes' is the title "Arms of Liberty", also derived from the broadside.

The decorations of the Wilkes Bowls are classified as "special orders", with the original designs made in Europe before getting sent over to Guangzhou, where the enamel is placed in local workshops and fired in small muffle kilns. These kinds of commissions are made during the duration of the cargo ship's docking and are considered highly lucrative by the ship captains and trading officers.

A variant of the Punch Bowl has "Wilkes and Liberty" in place of the "Arms of Liberty", a reference to the cheers and chants from his release from the 1763 arrest.

The ceramics were popular with the Sons of Liberty, and Wilkes' name would also appear on punch bowls made by Paul Revere, now at the Museum of Fine Arts, Boston.

Extant examples are in the collections of the Art Institute of Chicago, the Museum of the American Revolution, the British Museum, the Amherst Campuses, and many art museums housing ceramic wares. They also appear on the art market, with one example fetching £5,100 (British pounds) at auction in 2023.
