= Butterfield (surname) =

Butterfield is an English surname. Notable people with the surname include:

- Alexander Butterfield (1926–2026), official in the Nixon administration during the Watergate scandal
- Asa Butterfield (born 1997), English actor
- Benjamin Butterfield, British immigrant who was the founder of Chelmsford, Massachusetts, first Butterfield in America
- Billy Butterfield (aka Charles William Butterfield) (1917–1988), American jazz trumpeter and bandleader
- Brian James Butterfield (born 1958), Third base coach and infield instructor for the Boston Red Sox
- Daniel Adams Butterfield (1831–1901), United States Civil War Union general, "Taps" composer
- Danny Butterfield (aka Daniel Paul Butterfield) (born 1979), English footballer
- Dave Butterfield (born 1954), American football player
- Deborah Kay Butterfield (born 1949), U.S. artist
- Don Kiethly Butterfield (1923–2006), American tuba player
- G. K. Butterfield (born 1947), member of U.S. House of Representatives from North Carolina
- Herbert Butterfield (1900–1979), historian, author of 'The Whig Interpretation of History'
- Isaac Butterfield, American officer in the revolutionary war who surrendered in the Battle of the Cedars to George Forster
- Jack Butterfield (ice hockey) (aka John Arlington Butterfield) (1919–2010), president of the American Hockey League for 28 years from 1966 to 1994
- Jack Butterfield (baseball) (1929–1979), college baseball coach at Maine and South Florida and New York Yankees executive
- Jack Butterfield (footballer) (1922–2001), English footballer
- Jacob Luke Butterfield (born 1990), English footballer
- James Butterfield (aka Jim Butterfield) (born 1950), rower for Bermuda at the 1972 Olympics
- James Austin Butterfield (1837–1891), American composer of "When You and I Were Young, Maggie"
- Phillip James Butterfield Jr. (aka Jim Butterfield) (1927–2002), an American football player and coach
- Jeff Butterfield (1929–2004), international rugby union player
- Jeremy Nicholas Butterfield (born 1954), philosopher
- Jim Butterfield (aka Frank James Butterfield) (1936–2007), Canadian computer programmer
- Jo Butterfield (aka Joanna Shuni Butterfield) (born 1979), British field athlete
- Jock Butterfield (aka John Rutherford Butterfield) (1932–2004), New Zealand rugby league footballer
- John Butterfield, Baron Butterfield (aka William John Hughes Butterfield) (1920–2000), British medical researcher and administrator
- John Warren Butterfield (1801–1869), founder of Butterfield Overland Mail
- Len Butterfield (aka Leonard Arthur Butterfield) (1913–1999), New Zealand cricketer
- Rosaria Champagne Butterfield (born 1962), religious writer
- Paul Vaughn Butterfield (1942–1987), American blues musician, singer and harmonica player
- Spencer Darren Butterfield (born 1992), American basketball player
- Stewart Butterfield (aka Daniel Stewart Butterfield / Dharma Jeremy Butterfield) (born 1973), co-founder of Flickr
- Taahira Naeema Butterfield (born 2000), Bermudian sprinter
- Thomas Butterfield (c. 1871–1943), Australian politician
- Thomas C. Butterfield, mayor of Cork, Ireland from 1916 to 1919
- Tony Butterfield (aka Anthony Butterfield) (born 1966), Australian rugby league footballer
- Tyler Barbour Butterfield (born 1983), Bermudian cyclist and triathlete
- William Butterfield (British architect) (1814–1900), British architect
- William Butterfield (American architect) (aka William M. Butterfield) (1860–1932), American architect
- William Butterfield (auctioneer), founder of auction house Butterfield & Butterfield
