= Double Peacock Dinner Service =

Chinese export porcelain dining service

The Double Peacock Service is a pattern in Chinese export porcelain, using fine quality hard-paste porcelain for dinner and other services, in the European taste. Produced on order and perhaps for stock in China in the 18th century, it was brought to Europe and sold by the European trading companies. Technically, it is very characteristic of the Chinese export porcelain dinner services made in China to be used in Europe.

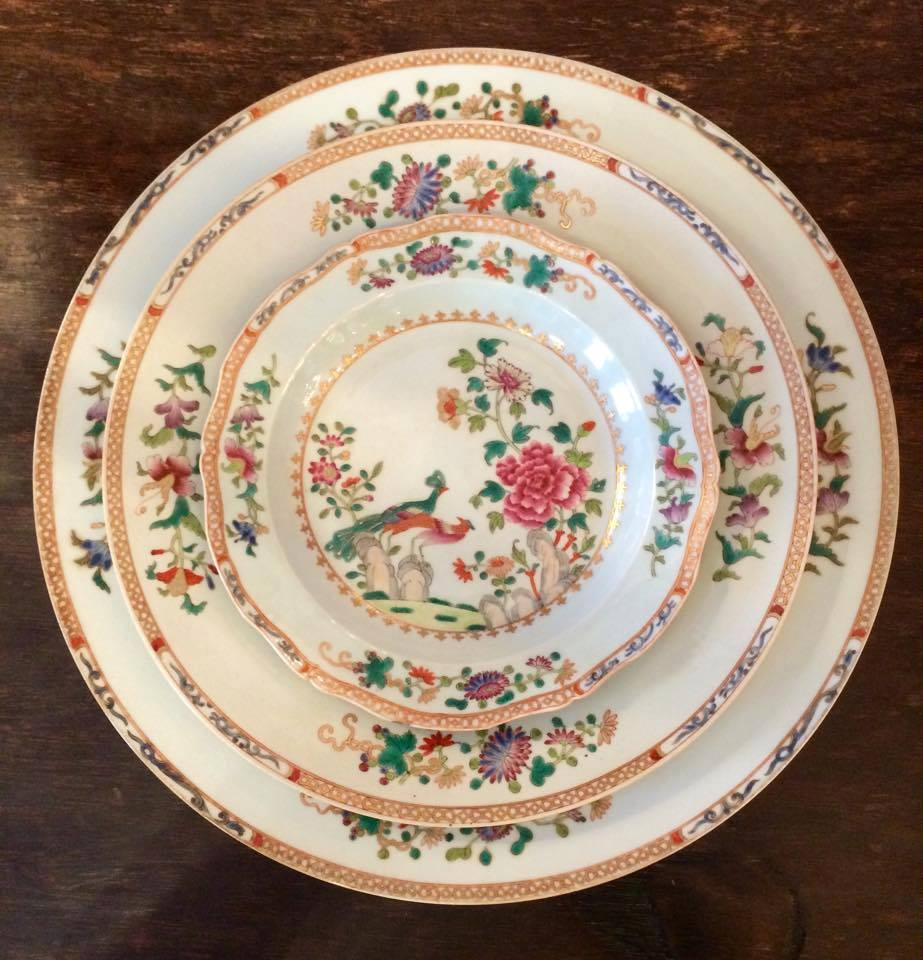
A set of medallion, rice dish, and dinner plate of the Double Peacock Service

Estimates say that about twenty thousand pieces of the "Peacock Service" (also known as "Double Peacock Service" or "Two Peacocks Service") were produced between 1750 and 1795, and today, perhaps 5,000 pieces survive, distributed throughout the world. This pattern is specially collected in Brazil, Portugal and England, and can be found in many museums.

With octagonal, rococo design or, in its latest batches, rounded shapes, the plate is made of white porcelain, decorated with overglaze enamels with the customary colours of the so-called "Famille Rose" style. The border contains four branches forming a cross and the edge in rouge de fer, always alternated with eye-catching stylizations of blue branches. In the center, two peacocks placed over rocks and a branch with big peonies, separated from the border of the piece by a fleur-de-lis frieze.

Besides plates of several sizes, many types of tureens, pots, gravy boats, platters with different shapes, butter tubs, honey and salt dishes, wine-coolers and bowls were made.

The name "Peacock Service" is used because this china has as decoration two of these animals on rocks, as its main element.

The expert Almeida Santos wrote in his Manual do Colecionador Brasileiro (Guide for the Brazilian Collector): "The services for imperial use, in Brazil, include the "Roosters", the "Shepherds", and the "Peacocks". The Double Peacock Service is the finest one of the "Famille Rose" and was made on demand for Europe, without any doubt. The "Peacocks" are very well designed. By the way, the chinaware is, let us say, a mix of the "Famille Verte" and the "Famille Rose". It has large roses painted showing up, which forces the classification as "Famille Rose", but the decoration in general is characteristic of the "Famille Verte", with landscapes and fowls."]

A pair of Sauce Boats, with stand, in perfect pristine condition.

It is a service known as a "traveller", because it was taken from China to Portugal, and from Portugal to Brazil, when John VI, then Prince Regent of Portugal, alarmed by the Peninsular War, moved to Rio de Janeiro with his mother, Queen Maria I. In Brazil, it was used in the Paço de São Cristóvão.

The Chinese porcelain services for imperial use, brought to Brazil by King John were dispersed after the Proclamation of the Republic, and as such they have become extremely rare pieces, largely sought by collectors from all over the world. Currently, pieces are sold mostly by the main auctioneers of Europe and the United States. A search on the Internet shows that many pieces have been sold in the last 20 years by Sotheby's, Bonham's, Christie's and Bukowskis auction houses.

Pieces of this specific service are also part of the porcelain collection of the Nathaniel Russell House Museum in Charleston, in the United States, as well as of the Historical National Museum of Brazil and the Ema Klabin Foundation.

Quite a few double peacock patterns were made in the 18th and 19th centuries, inspired by this one, that are also cited in the bibliography about Chinese Export Porcelain. However, it is this very specific pattern that is often sold as King John VI's dinner service. Jorge Veiga dedicated pages 177 to 179 of his renowned book "Chinese Export Porcelain in Private Brazilian Collections" to this dinner service and established that there are five different patterns that are considered specially valuable by collectors.

== Bibliography ==
ALMEIDA SANTOS, José de. Manual do Colecionador Brasileiro. 1950.

VEIGA, Jorge Getúlio. A Porcelana da Companhia das Índias nas Coleções Particulares Brasileiras. 1986.

BRANCANTE, Eldino da Fonseca. O Brasil e a louça da Índia. 1950.

MORAN, Mark (org.). Antique Trader Oriental Antiques & Arts: An Identification and Price Guide. 2003.
