= Isaac Butterfield =

18th-century American military officer

Isaac Butterfield was an American officer who served under Colonel Timothy Bedel during the invasion of Quebec in the American Revolutionary War. He was either a Major or a Lieutenant at the time.

He surrendered to George Forster in the Battle of the Cedars on May 18, 1776, after Bedel left him in charge. He was briefly a prisoner of war until Forster returned the American prisoners as a planned exchange the Americans did not reciprocate.

Benedict Arnold removed both Butterfield and Bedel from command and was court-martialed for this in August 1776.
