= 995 Fifth Avenue =

Residential building in Manhattan, New York

General information
- Location: Manhattan, New York, 995 Fifth Avenue
- Coordinates: 40°46′40″N 73°57′45″W
- Opening: 1927
- Closed: 2005

Technical details
- Floor count: 16

Design and construction
- Architect: Rosario Candela

995 Fifth Avenue is a 16-story co-op apartment building at the southeast corner of Fifth Avenue and East 81st Street on the Upper East Side of Manhattan, New York City, across Fifth Avenue from Central Park and the Metropolitan Museum of Art's Fifth Avenue building. It was constructed in 1926 as The Stanhope Apartment Hotel and designed by Rosario Candela. The building was converted to a residential co-op with 26 units in 2005 and renamed The Stanhope. It has since been renamed to its address.

== History ==
The Stanhope Apartment Hotel opened in 1927 under the ownership of the 955 Fifth Avenue Corporation. It shortly passed into the ownership of Benjamin Winter, Inc. in 1928, followed by joint ownership among four banks, including the Bank of United States, in 1932, after Winter's default. Following acquisition by Hopestand Realty Corporation, the Stanhope Hotel built a reputation for luxury and live music. The hotel's Rembrandt Room cabaret featured George Feyer from 1968 to 1980, and Greta Keller for several weeks each year through 1964, returning for a week's encore in 1971.

Hotel ownership changed twice in 1961, first to Webb Knapp, Inc. in August, then to the Alliance Realty Company in October. The hotel continued its reputation as home to many well-to-do New Yorkers and entertaining celebrity visitors like Ringo Starr in 1969.

Judson Realty purchased the hotel in 1980 and renamed it the American Stanhope Hotel as a statement about several major local hotels passing into foreign ownership. In 1982, Herbie Mann established the music policy at the hotel's Saratoga Room restaurant.

The hotel was acquired by New York developer Gerald Guterman's Hanover Companies for $19 million in 1986. He undertook a $26 million Louis XV-style renovation with plans to sell the 132 rooms and suites as cooperatives while running the building as a luxury hotel. When the hotel reopened following renovations, it was among the first hotels in the city to pass the room cost of $200 per night. Unfortunately, the expected profit was not realized and the Hanover subsidiary that owned the Stanhope PRE-packaged and filed for Chapter 11 bankruptcy protection in February 1988.

The hotel was purchased by Tobishima Associates at a November 1988 bankruptcy auction for $76 million. Tobishima invested $5 million more in renovations, but then sold the hotel in 1998 for only $15 million to a partnership of Richard Born, Ira Drucker and Los Angeles-based Colony Capital.

In 1999, the hotel was purchased by Hyatt Hotels for $65 million. At that point, the hotel also paid $2 million annually to the estate of Sol Goldman, which owned the leased ground on which the structure sat. Hyatt renamed the property The Stanhope, A Park Hyatt Hotel, and then later The Stanhope Park Hyatt New York. The hotel's cabaret was revived as the Melrose Room, featuring talents including pianist Steve Ross and soprano Anna Bergman. It ceased operation as a hotel on January 13, 2005.

=== Conversion to an apartment ===
It was converted to co-op that year and first operated as The Stanhope, later changed to 995 Fifth Avenue.

== Notable people ==
=== Famous residents ===
- Daphne Guinness
- Pannonica de Koenigswarter

=== Famous deaths ===
- 1946: Kiki Preston (née Alice Gwynne), plunged out a window.
- 1955: Charlie Parker, in the suite of Nica de Koenigswarter.

== See also ==
- List of former hotels in Manhattan
