= Jan Jansz. Treck =

Dutch Golden Age still-life painter

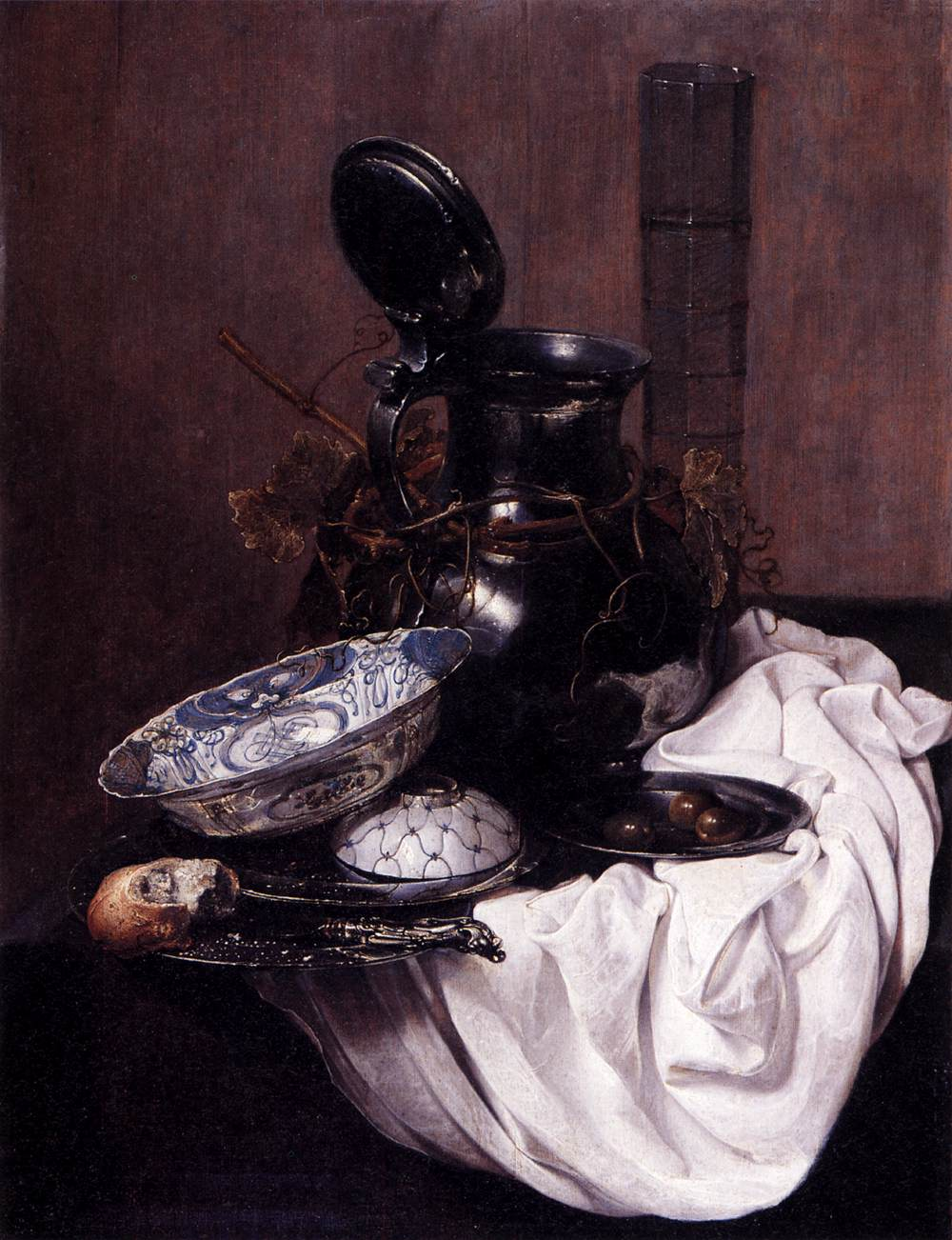
Still Life with drinking glass, wanli porcelain, pewter jug, olives and napkin 1645, Museum of Fine Arts (Budapest)

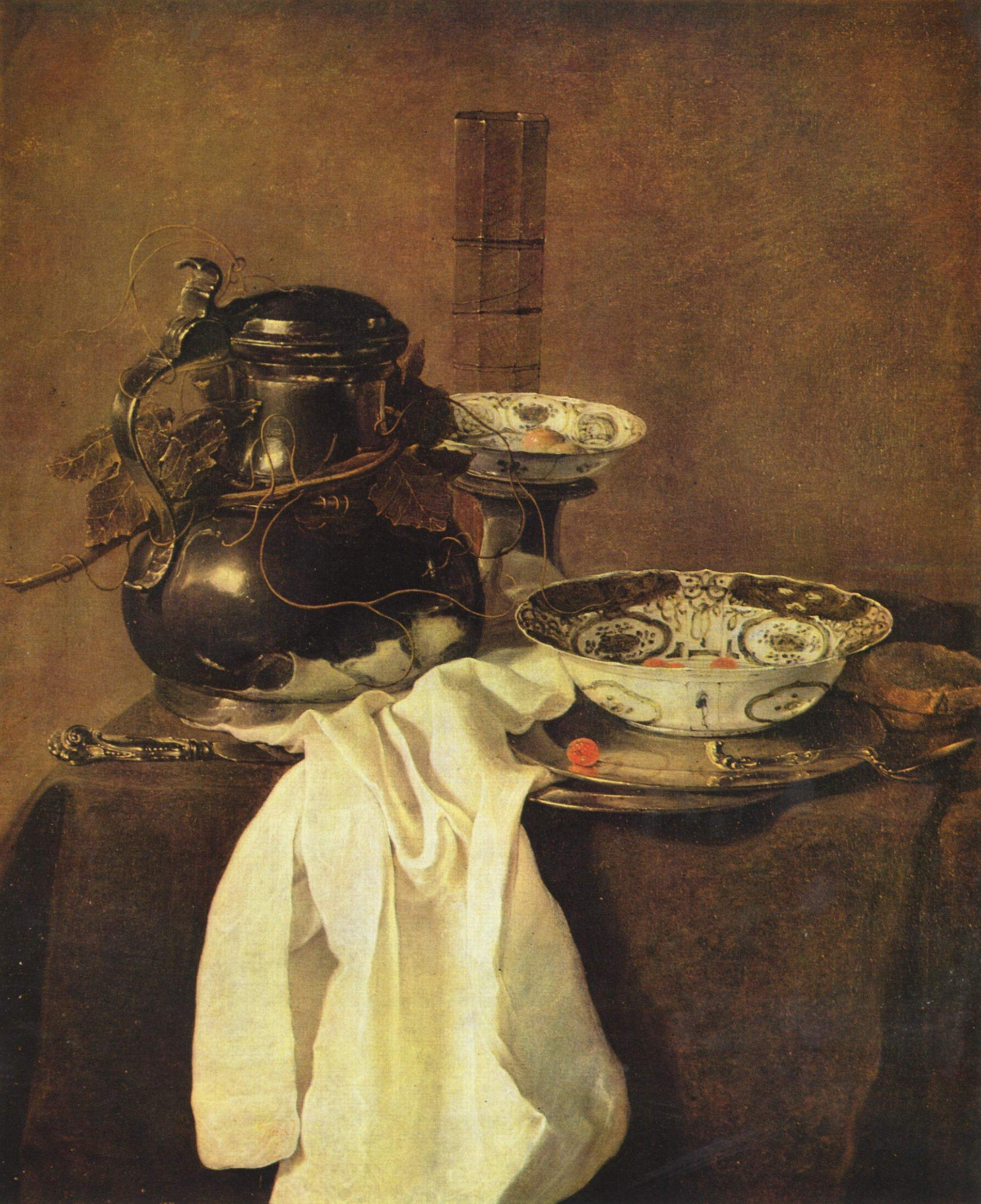
Painting by Jan Trek.

Jan Jansz. Treck (1606, Amsterdam, 25 September 1652) was a still-life painter during the Dutch Golden Age. Treck used economy in the number of his objects.

== Life ==
In 1623 Treck was trained for half a year by Jan den Uyl, who had married his sister Geertruid in 1619. His style also shows influence by Pieter Claesz and Willem Heda. In 1643 and 1644 Treck was trained by Abraham Jansz for 4 guilders a week, but forgot to pay for his apprenticeship. He also had to pay for a window that was made to get more light, while working.

His earliest known signed and dated work is from 1641, after the death of Den Uyl. A work has surfaced with both signatures, implying that Treck perhaps finished Den Uyl's paintings after his death. Treck also had helped his brother-in-law to sell his house (on Singel) in 1639. After the death of his friend Abraham, Treck bought his equipment, paint and easel. In 1640 he supplied the art dealer Hendrick Uylenburgh with money.

After Treck's death his brother, sister and his niece and nephews inherited a small house in an alley from Singel to Spuistraat, furniture, clothes, stocks, coins, jewelry, prints and paintings. In 1661 Simon Luttichuys was asked to repaint a vanitas done by Treck.

Treck influenced Pieter van Anraedt and Willem Kalf.
