= Butterfield Market =

American boutique supermarket and catering

Butterfield Market and Catering LLC
- Type: Private
- Industry: Supermarket, Catering
- Founded: 1915 or 1926
- Headquarters: New York City, New York, U.S.
- Key people: Theodore “Teddy”Appelbaum, Alan Obsatz, Joelle Obsatz, Evan Obsatz
- Owner: Obsatz family
- Website: butterfieldmarket.com

Butterfield Market is an upscale grocery store with its original store located at 1114 Lexington Avenue. On September 2, 2020, it opened its second store located at 1150 Madison Avenue, also on the Upper East Side of Manhattan in New York City. It is named for the old telephone exchange name for the neighborhood, Butterfield 8. Butterfield cites a founding date of 1915 as a small grocery store, though an article in The New York Times cites its founding as a produce stand in 1926 at the corner of Lexington and 78th Street, across the street from its current first location. According to the Times, it was founded by an Italian grocer whose name is lost to history.

Neighborhood customers have included Brooke Astor, John D. Rockefeller, and Bette Davis. The market once flew in 100 boxes of strawberries for a Christmas party thrown by Davis. The fictional character Trudy Campbell on the television show Mad Men is also a customer of Butterfield, as revealed in the episode "Souvenir".

== Social media popularity ==
In 2026, Butterfield Market gained significant popularity for selling Dot Cakes (also known as Dotcups). The single-serving nonpareil sprinkle-topped cake cups, supplied by The Dotcakes bakery in Roslyn, New York, went viral on TikTok and Instagram, leading to long lines and rapid sell-outs at the stores shortly after their introduction.

As a result of the store's increased popularity, co-owner Joelle Obsatz added more point-of-sale systems and directed employees to stand outside to manage lines. She scheduled the Dot Cakes to be placed on shelves at quiet times of day for the store.
