= Gerald Guterman =

American businessman

Gerald Guterman is an international real estate developer and investor. He is one of the largest multi-family apartment owner/operators (78,000+- apartments) and condominium converters in the United States, converting through 2017, 16,028 rental apartments to cooperative and condominium ownership throughout the United States. He also served as Operations Adviser to the Minister of Privatization, Government of Romania; chairman, Committee on Romanian Banking & Finance Operations, United States Center for Strategic and International Studies, Washington, DC; Co-chairman, Committee for Romanian Enterprise Development and Operations, United States Center for Strategic and International Studies, Washington, DC; Operations Advisor to the Interior Minister, Government of Austria; Operations and Financial Advisor to the President, Government of Romania. He is currently the chairman and CEO of Guterman Partners, LLC.

Gerald Guterman was born on June 13, 1942. He began a career in real estate at the age of 18 as a night porter for Fred Trump, father of famed developer Donald Trump. The Brooklyn-born son of a beverage wholesaler, Guterman amassed a fortune with over 18,600 rental apartments purchased for his own account as well as an additional 16,028 apartments which he purchased and converted to condominium and co-op in sixteen states and separately, operated more than 60,000 rental apartments in fourteen states for unaffiliated, third-party owners. Guterman also purchased, rehabilitated and resold 605 single family houses in 7 states and purchased and operated more than 3,250,000 net rentable square feet of office properties in eight states, as well as large-scale housing and commercial developments throughout the United States, Europe and the Middle East.

Since 1978 through 2025 to date and without exception, both Gerald Guterman personally and Guterman Partners, LLC, the operating company founded by Gerald Guterman in 1969, as well as its subsidiaries, have had no debts, secured or unsecured, directly or indirectly, personally or corporately, for any reason or no reason, of any type or kind.

Since 1969, Gerald Guterman has been and continues today in 2025, to own and control 60% of the total outstanding ownership interests in Guterman Partners, LLC, without any direct or indirect encumberance.

Since 1978 and through 2025 to date, all property acquisitions made by Gerald Guterman personally or Guterman Partners, LLC and/or its subsidiaries, have been made without any debt of any type or kind, whether directly or indirectly or secured or unsecured.

Beginning in the 1980s and continuing through the 90's, Gerald Guterman became one of the largest owner/operators and property managers in the United States, owning and operating over 18,600 rental apartments in 55 residential communities for his own long term interests, together with an additional 16,918 apartments which he purchased and operated and converted to condominium and cooperative ownership in 21 residential communities in sixteen states. Additionally, Gerald Guterman directly purchased 9,106 apartments by bulk sale and successfully converted those apartments to condominium ownership, thereby successfully converting a total of 26,024 rental apartments to condominium ownership.

Guterman Partners, LLC operated more than 60,000 additional rental apartments in over 250 third party owned rental communities nationwide.

Guterman's companies were also the original builder/developer of Roosevelt Island's residential housing as well as the developer of Harris Branch, the 1,808 acre planned unit development in Austin, Texas as well as several developments in Europe and the Middle East.

Additionally and in order to enhance is firm's construction capabilities, Guterman acquired two nationwide construction companies known as the Titan Group, Ltd and Sovereign Construction Co. Ltd. Historical projects include:

- New York's Roosevelt Island Development and Housing, New York, New York.
- United States Gold Depository, Fort Knox, Kentucky,
- United States Military Academy, West Point, New York
- Cleveland Hopkins Airport, Cleveland, Ohio,

Beginning in the 1990s through 2016, Guterman planned, organized and directly negotiated the acquisition of the largest single, direct purchase of office properties (Patriot American Investors) in the history of The Federal Deposit Insurance Corporation, hereafter known as Mack-Cali Real Estate Investment Trust as well as thirty-one multiple tenant office buildings containing more than 3,250,000 net rentable square feet of office space located in Eight States

Additionally, during the same period in the 1990s, Guterman also directly negotiated and completed the purchase of the original hotel properties together known as the “Patriot American Hospitality Portfolio” from The Federal Deposit Insurance Corporation (“FDIC”). Thereafter known as Wyndham Hotels and Resorts.

Through 2016, Guterman has also acquired 14 luxury hotels containing approximately 2,366 keys, located in New York, New Orleans, London, Europe and the Middle East, as well the purchasing the only magnetic monorail system in the United States.

Guterman Partners continues to develop condominium housing, with recent communities in Chicago, Illinois; Fort Myers, Florida; Fort Pierce, Florida; Naples, Florida; Ocean Springs, Mississippi; Biloxi, Mississippi; St. Paul, Minnesota and Phoenix, Arizona and Houston, Texas. A significant number of acquisitions of multi-family residential and hotel properties have been successfully completed and converted to condominium ownership but have not been shared with the public, due to an attempted kidnapping of a senior operating partner of the company in the early 1990s and later, several threats against one of the Guterman children.

== A bar mitzvah aboard the QE2 ==
In September 1986, Gerald Guterman drew media attention when he chartered the famed ocean liner Queen Elizabeth 2 along with a crew of over 1,000, for his 13-year-old son's bar mitzvah party. Although the QE2 had been chartered for cruises by corporations, the Guterman family party was a first of its kind, said a spokesman for the Cunard line. The guests were mostly relatives, friends and neighbors of Gutermans who lived in Bedford, N.Y., in Westchester County, or friends of the children from camp or school. In attendance were numerous politicians and real estate figures including New York City Council, President Andrew J. Stein, Comptroller Harrison J. Goldin. The ship set sail at 6 p.m. though helicopters continued to touch down on the sports deck to drop off late-comers, including Ivan F. Boesky, the stock and investment speculator. When asked about the cruise in a recent interview for his upcoming biography, Guterman remarks that he maintains mixed feelings about the event. "On the one hand, it was a fantastic and extraordinary celebration for my family. As a father, I was proud of my children and wanted to give them the things I never had growing up as a poor kid in Brooklyn. On the other hand, when you wind up on the front page Leisure Section of New York Times, you leave yourself open for backlash, especially in those rare times of financial struggle."

== The Guterman Collection ==
Beginning in the 1970s, Guterman acquired a collection of 17th-century, Dutch and Flemish Old Master paintings. The collection was referred to by experts as one of the very best in America. The paintings were housed in a 3,000 sq ft (280 m^{2}) gallery (created in the image of Manhattan's famous Frick Gallery) in a wing of Guterman's Bedford Estate. Artists in Guterman's collection included Rembrandt, Renoir, Barent Fabritius, Solomon van Ruysdael, Frans Hals, Hendrick Avercamp, Jan Lievens, Govaert Flinck, and Jan van Goyen, to name a few.

== 1988 tax law reversal ==
In 1988, a new tax law eliminated the tax shelter aspect of the co-op conversion model, making them less desirable and resulting in heavy financial setbacks for Guterman and his Companies. Having already taken financial losses in the "Black Monday" stock market crash of 1987, Guterman placed his Stanhope Hotel (purchased in 1985 for $19,600,000) into Chapter 11 and immediately sold the hotel to Tobishima (a property company from Japan) for over $76,000,000.

Further setbacks were created by a divorce decree that forced Guterman to sell his renowned art collection, considered at the time to be the most valuable such selection of Old Master paintings ever auctioned in New York. While the sale of Guterman's paintings brought "the highest total ever for an Old Master sale in America" and set 11 artist's records for price, to some it was disappointing.

Describing the buying as "very selective", John L. Marion, Sotheby's chairman, said: "On the one hand, it is the highest total ever for an Old Master sale in America and there were 11 artist's records set. On the other hand, you could observe the fact that there was little or no bidding from dealers. I think this means these were not the kind of pictures they buy for stock."

Guterman's active support of some New York politicians, such as Ed Koch and Comptroller Harrison J. Goldin also brought repeated scrutiny from the New York news media. A new law was passed in 1988 that limited private campaign contributions and drew scrutiny to both Donald Trump and Gerald Guterman. While their contributions were discussed at the hearings, the new law did not prohibit their practices that drew so much attention:

For example, the developer Donald Trump told the commission that in 1985 he spread tens of thousands of dollars in contributions to City Council President Andrew J. Stein among 18 subsidiary companies to skirt the state's limits of $50,000 for individual and $5,000 for corporate contributions. Another developer, Gerald Guterman, contributed $100,000 in one month to Mr. Goldin by parceling the gifts among 21 companies.

The Patriot deal drew criticism from congress in a report that called the RTC model for disposing of savings and loan properties in bulk "wasteful" and "uncompetitive." Further, the report criticized the RTC for negotiating with Guterman while he was under investigation, though it was also noted that Guterman had been falsely accused and that all charges had been withdrawn or dismissed.

== Trusteeships and charitable participation ==
Guterman served as a trustee of The Metropolitan Museum of Art, Adelphi University, New York City Opera, Dallas Opera, Young Men's Philanthropic League, Rippowam Cisqua School, and Harvey School. He also served as a commissioner of the United States Romania Action Commission under the sponsorship of the United States Center for Strategic and International Studies, as well as chairman of its banking and financing committees. Guterman served as personal financial advisor to the Minister of Privatization, Government of Romania.

Guterman is a founder of Albert Einstein College of Medicine as well as a member of the Society of Founders of Miami University College of Medicine He was awarded "Humanitarian of the Year" by the Juvenile Diabetes Foundation. Guterman is a founding benefactor of Research Laboratory for the Study of Tumor Cell Biology and Research Laboratory for the Study of Immunodeficiency Disease at the National Asthma Center. He also established a joint Research Chair in Medical Engineering at Harvard University and The Massachusetts Institute of Technology.
