= South China Sea shipwrecks =

South China Sea shipwrecks may refer to:

- Nanhai One, a Song dynasty ship sometimes called South China Sea-I (via translation of "Nanhai")
- Nan'ao One, a Ming dynasty ship previously called South China Sea-II
- Shipwrecks found in the South China Sea
