= Nan'ao One =

Sunken Chinese merchant ship

Coordinates: 23°40′N 117°20′E

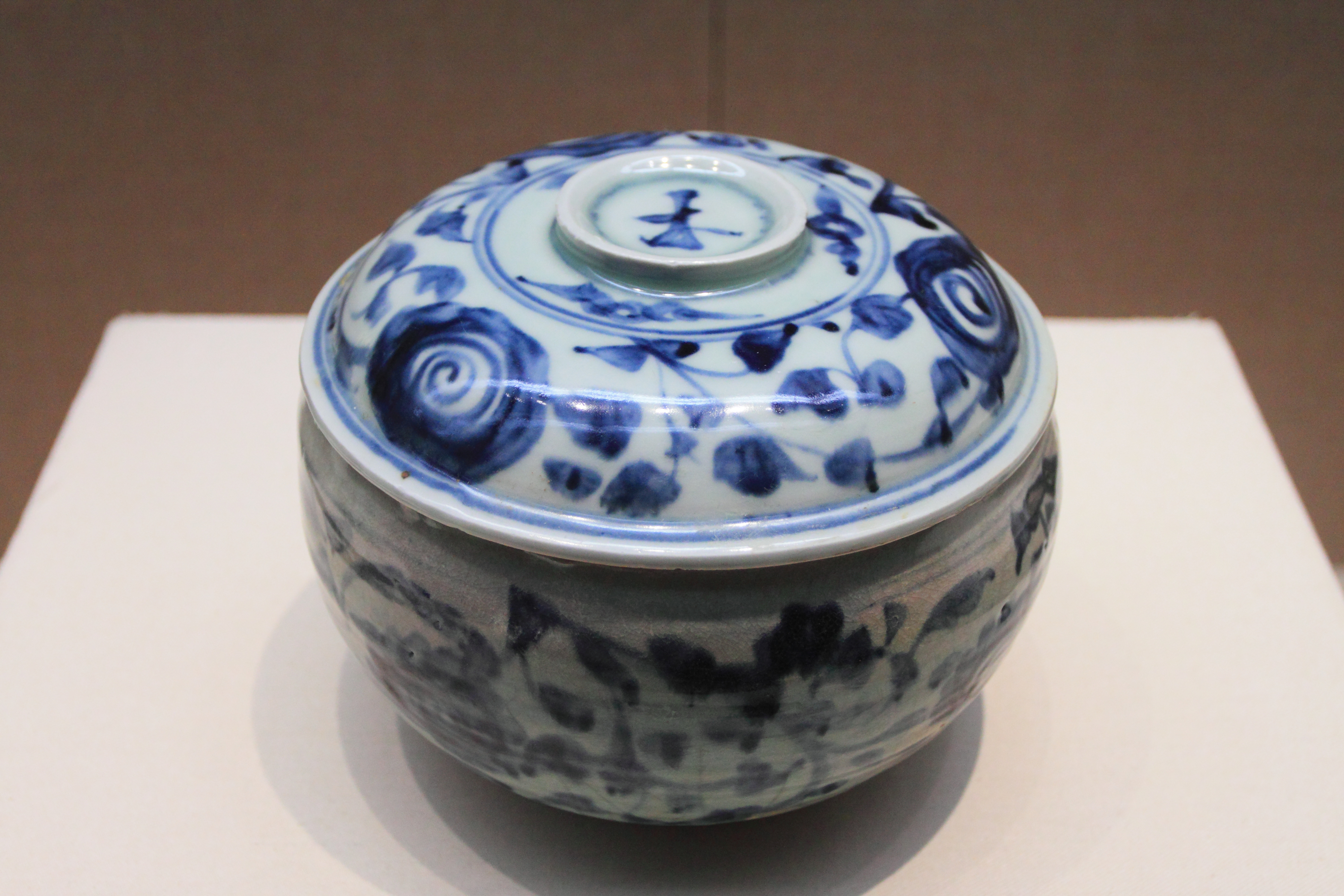
Zhangzhou kiln blue and white porcelain gaiwan recovered from the Nan'ao One wreck, Guangdong Museum

Nan'ao One (南澳一号) is a 25.5 m (84 ft), 7.0 m (23 ft) wide Chinese merchant ship that sank in the Sandianjin waters off the coast of Nan'ao Island, about 5.6 nautical miles from Swatow (Shantou), Guangdong, Ming China. Accidentally discovered by a group of local fishermen in May 2007, it is currently considered the first late Ming dynasty (1368–1644) ship ever found and probably the only one from the reign of the Wanli Emperor (1573–1620) that China has discovered to date. It was likely on the route from the port of Yuegang in Fujian to Manila, Spanish Philippines.

== See also ==
- Nanhai One
- Huaguangjiao One
- Swatow ware
- Kraak ware
