= Kraak ware =

Chinese Ming Dynasty export porcelain

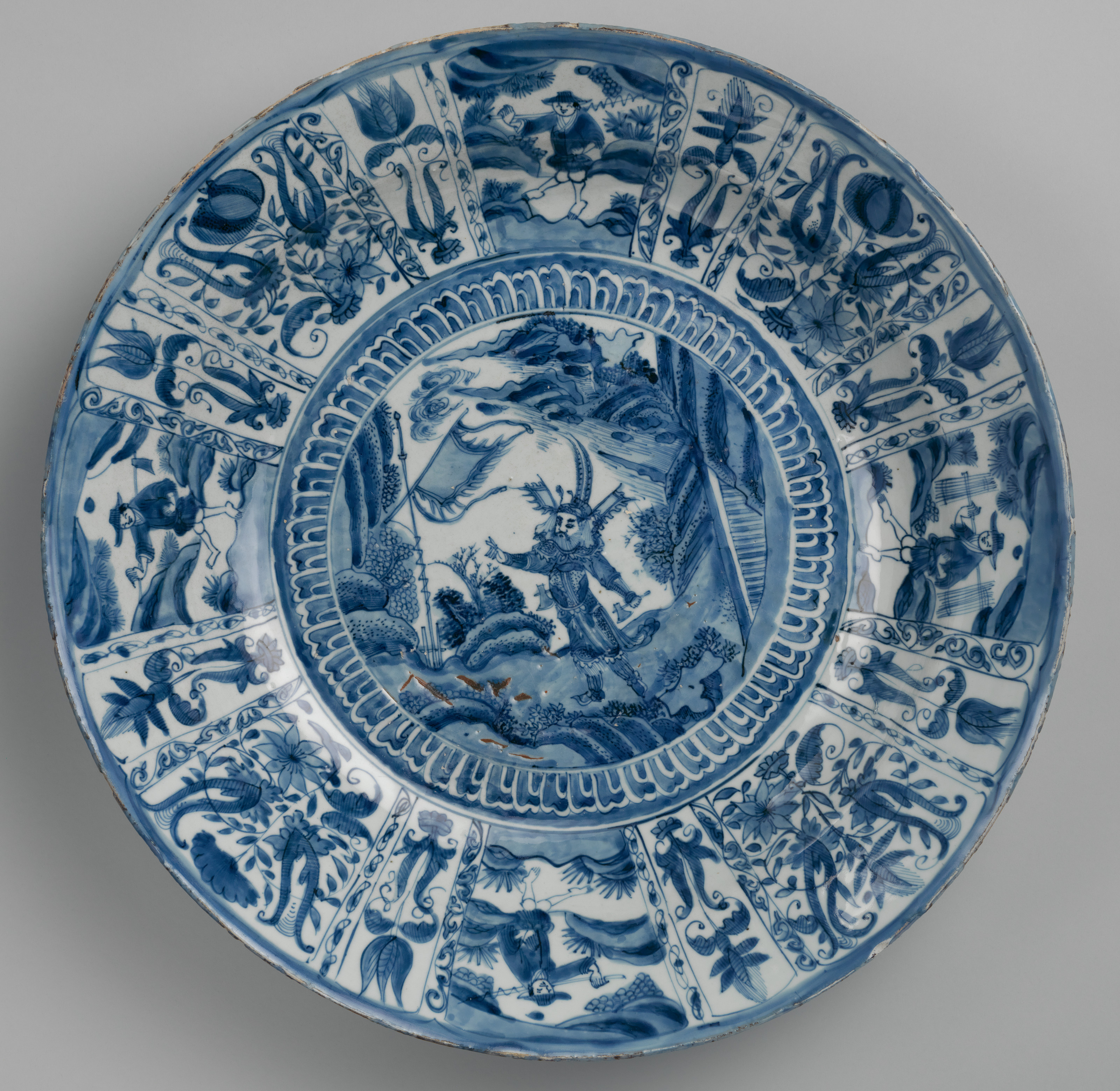
Jingdezhen dish of typical shape. Width: 18 5/8 in. (47.3 cm). For profile view see below.

Kraak ware or Kraak porcelain (Dutch Kraakporselein) is a type of Chinese export porcelain produced mainly in the late Ming dynasty, in the Wanli reign (1573–1620), but also in the Tianqi (1620–1627) and the Chongzhen (1627–1644). It was among the first Chinese export wares to arrive in Europe in mass quantities, and was frequently featured in Dutch Golden Age paintings of still life subjects with foreign luxuries.

The wares have "suffered from imprecise terminology", sometimes being loosely used for many varieties of Chinese export blue and white pottery. Strictly defined, it "is distinguished by the arrangement of its ornament into panels; these usually radiate to a bracketed rim notorious for its liability to chip". It is a sub-class of Jingdezhen ware, mostly made as "deep bowls and wide dishes", decorated with motifs from nature, in a style not used on wares for the domestic Chinese market.

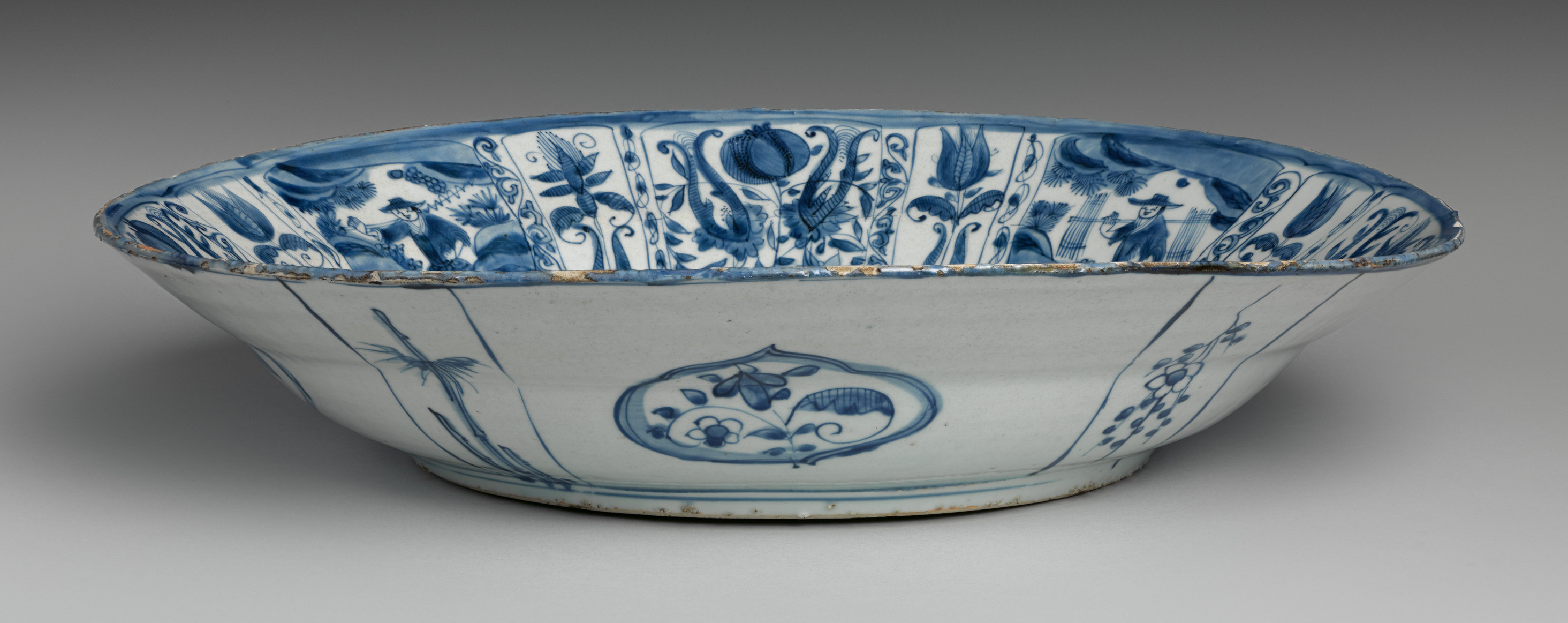
Profile view of Jingdezhen dish above

The quality of the porcelain used to form Kraak ware is much disputed among scholars; some claim that it is surprisingly good, in certain cases indistinguishable from that produced on the domestic market; others imply that it is a dismal shadow of the truly fine ceramics China was capable of producing. Rinaldi comes to a more even-handed conclusion, noting that it "forms a middle category between much heavier wares, often coarse, and definitely finer wares with well levigated clay and smooth glaze that does not shrink on the rim..." Thus looking at ceramic production in China at the time from a wider perspective, Kraak ware falls between the best examples and a typical provincial output, such as the contemporary Swatow ware, also made for export, but to South-East Asia and Japan.

== Name ==
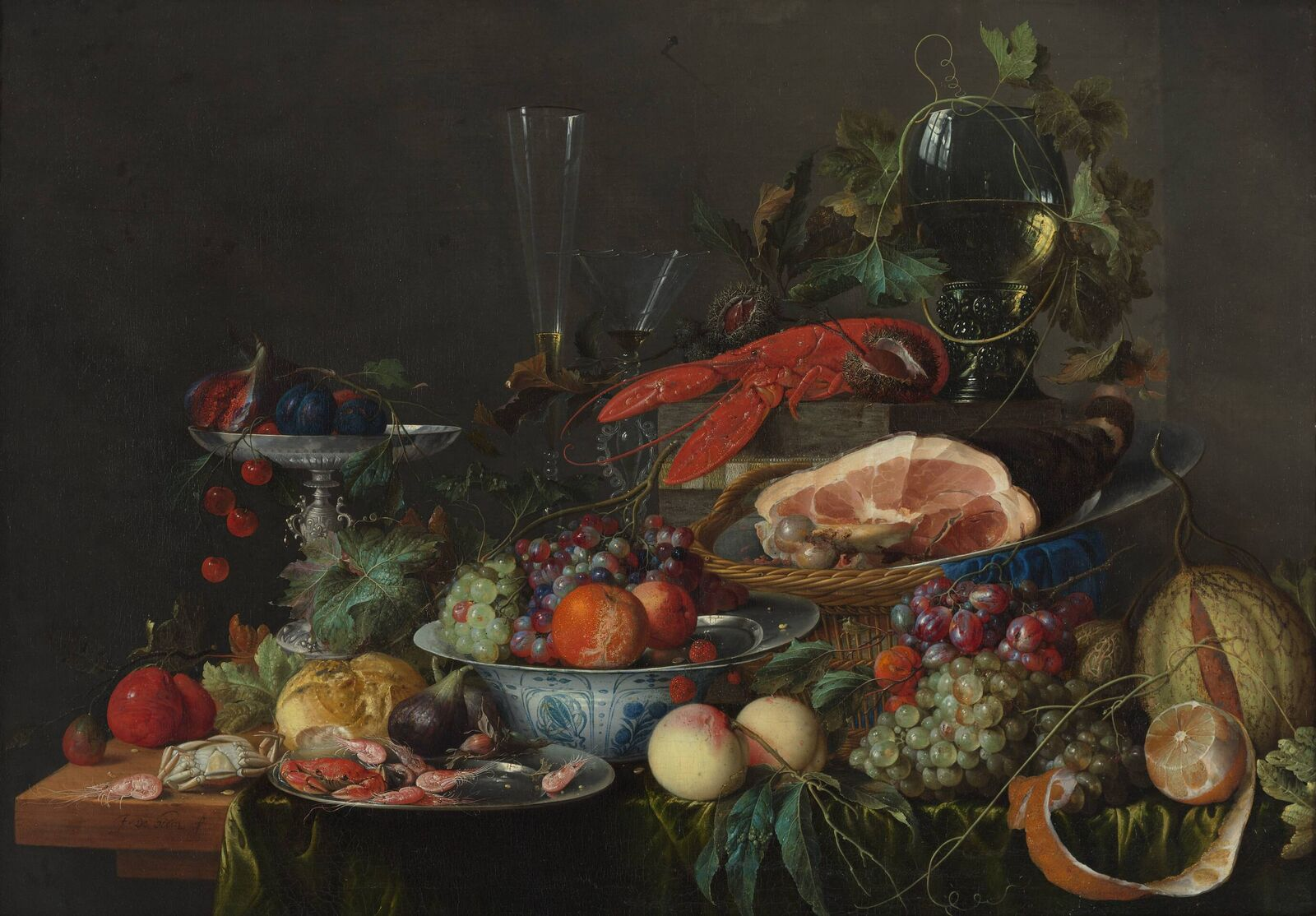
Jan Davidsz de Heem, Still Life with Fruit and Lobster, second half of 17th century; Oil on canvas, 75 × 105 cm; Museum Boymans-van Beuningen, Rotterdam

Kraak porcelain is believed to be named after the Portuguese ships (carracks), in which it was transported. Carrak—or caracca in Italian or Spanish—is itself believed to be a derivative of the Arabic term for the type of trading ships used in Renaissance Mediterranean trade: qaraquir, meaning simply merchant vessels. Although the link with Carrak ships is generally accepted as the root of the name Kraak ware, other origins of the label have also been proposed. For example, Rinaldi points out that in Dutch the verb kraken means 'to break'—a characteristic that certainly is common among Kraak wares. Moreover, the term refers to the type of shelves that often displayed import blue and white porcelains in Friesland, in the north of the Netherlands.

== Style ==
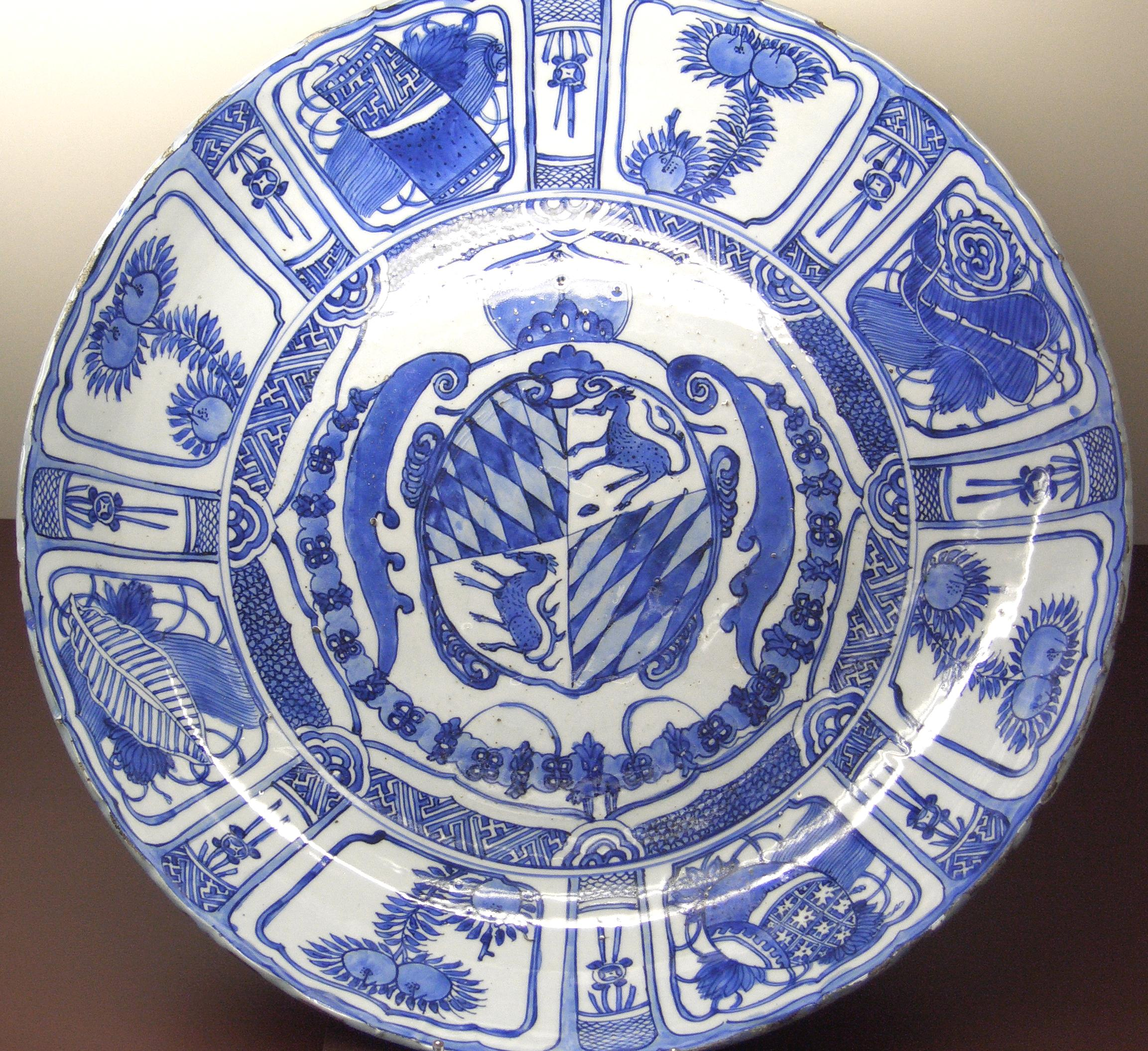
Relatively unusual Kraak armorial porcelain, for the Wittelsbach family; Wanli reign

Kraak ware is almost all painted in the underglaze cobalt blue and white porcelain style that was perfected under the Ming dynasty, although a few examples of dishes over-painted with vitreous enamel glaze have survived. It is often decorated with variations on the more traditional motifs found on Chinese porcelain, such as stylized flowers (peonies and chrysanthemums) and Buddhist auspicious emblems. However, most characteristic of Kraak decoration is the use of foliated radial panels. In other words, the surface of the porcelain is divided into segments, each containing its own discrete image.

Shapes included dishes, bowls, and vases. Kraak ware bowls fall into roughly two types; the first is a deep, unrimmed Chinese style bowl, taking roughly the same shape as the Qing enameled cup. The second type are called klapmutsen. A klapmuts is somewhat akin to what we would today call a soup-bowl—a broader-based, rimmed style that was new in the Chinese repertoire, and seems to have been exclusively exported to Europe. (Two such examples are at the center of de Heem's Still Life, above: one holds fruit, and the other a shaved ham.)

The specialist Maura Rinaldi suggests that the latter type was designed specifically to serve a European clientele, since there do not seem to be many surviving examples elsewhere in the world, even in the spectacular Topkapı Palace collection, which houses the most extensive selection of Kraak ware of all. Noting the importance of soups and stews in European diet, Rinaldi proposes that klapmusten were developed to satisfy a foreign demand, noting that the heavy, long-handled, metal spoon that is common in Europe would have toppled and chipped the high-walled Chinese bowl.

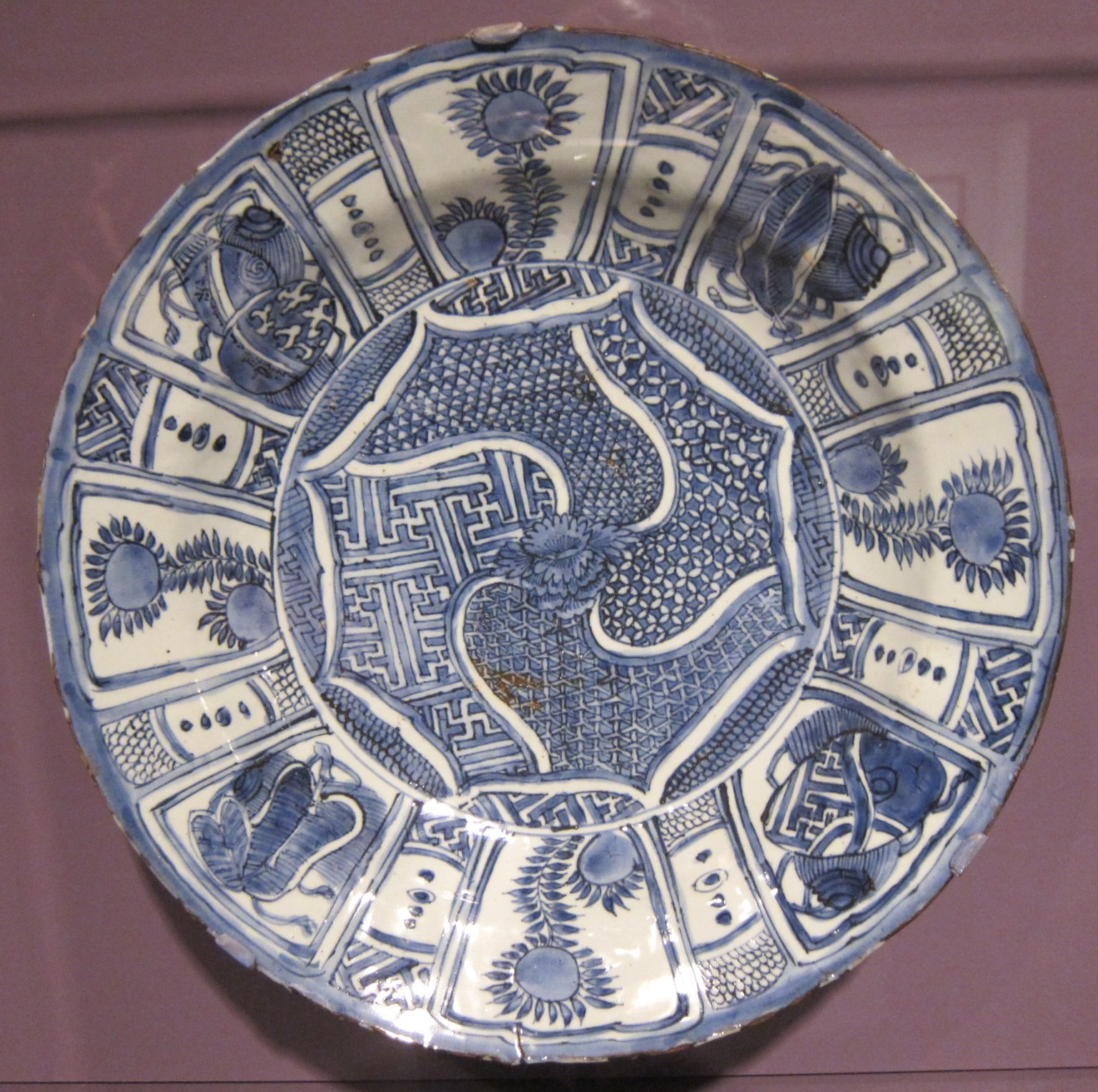
Jingdezhen, Wanli period

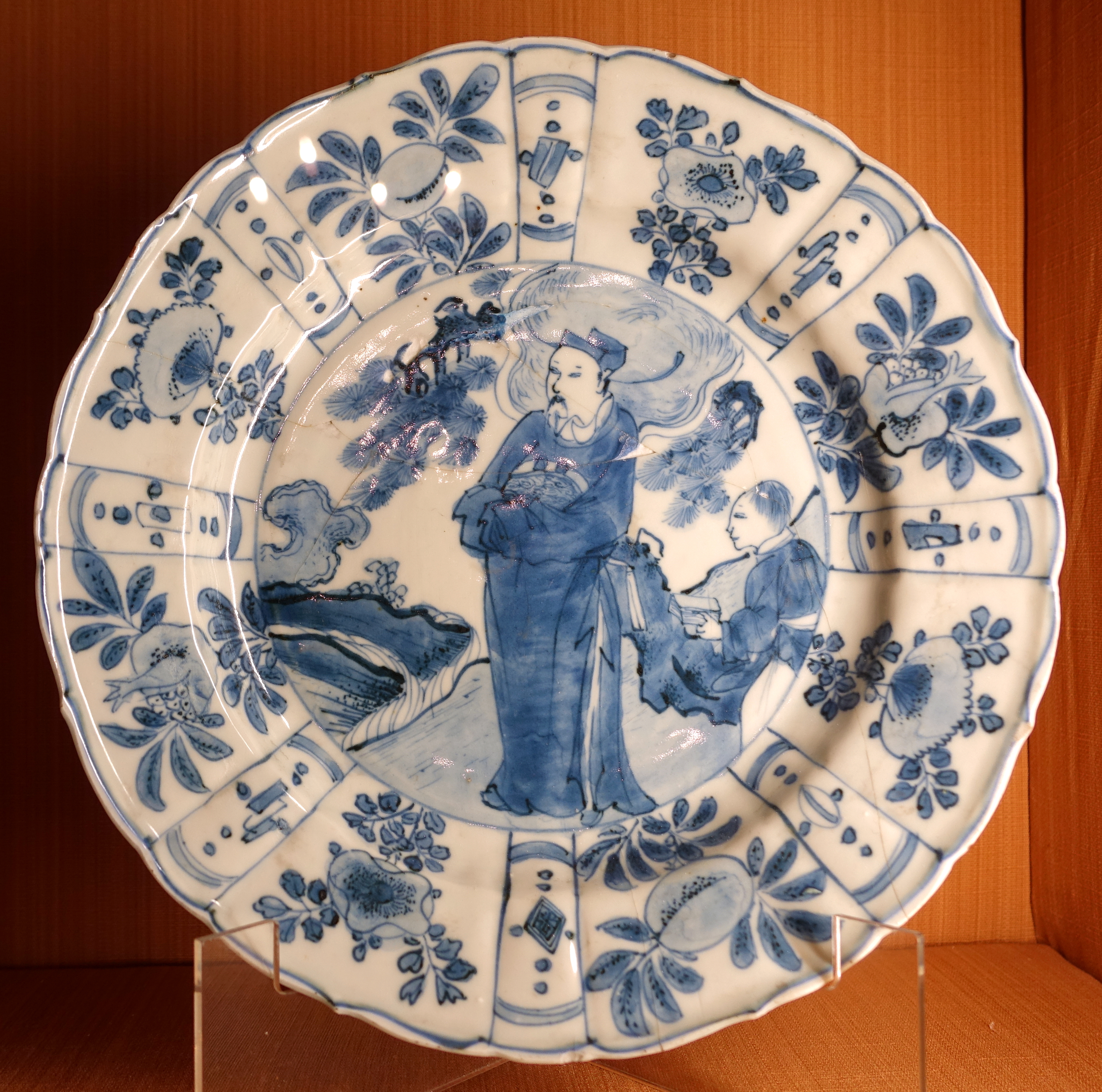
Dish with figure

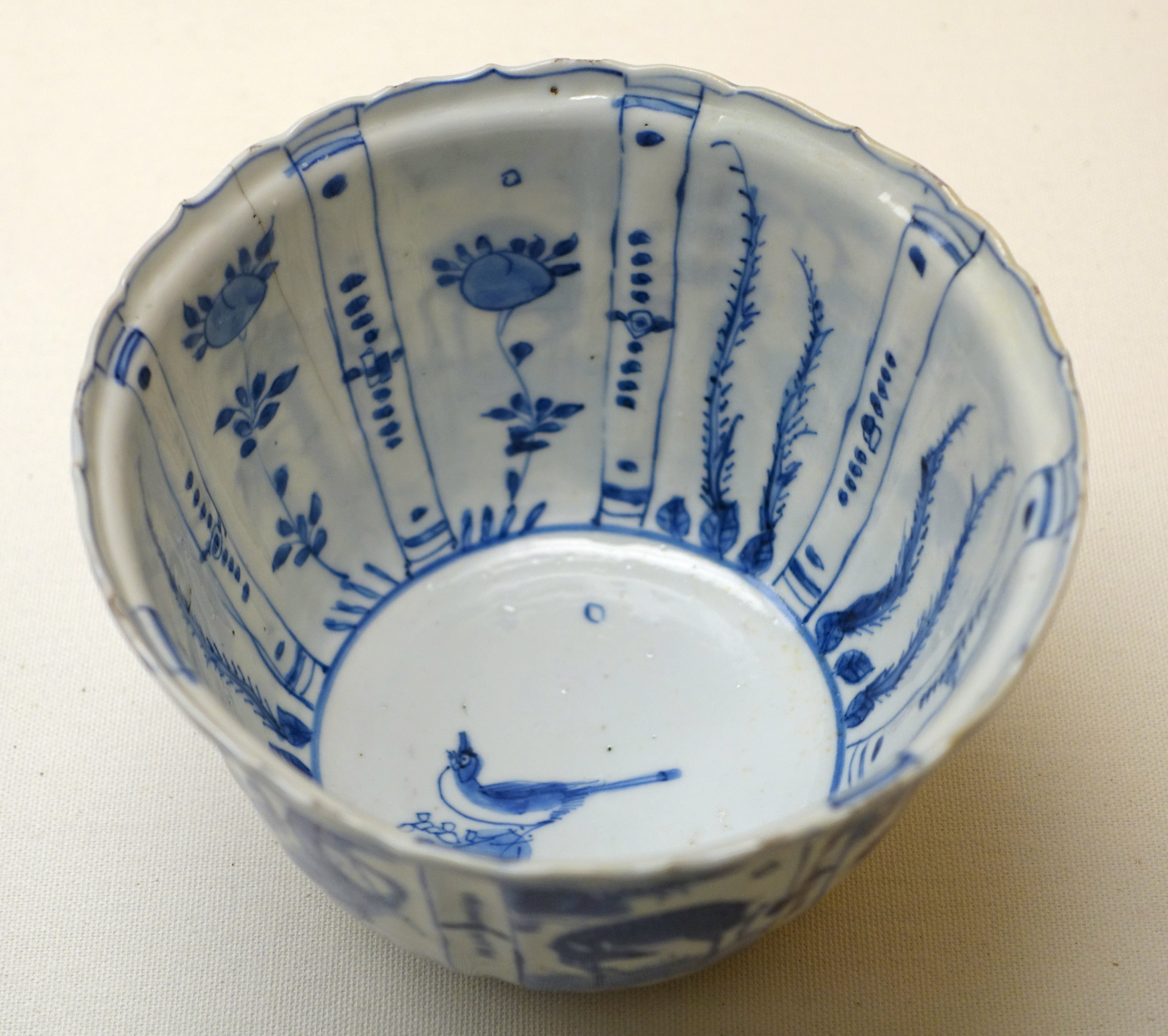
Bowl, c. 1600

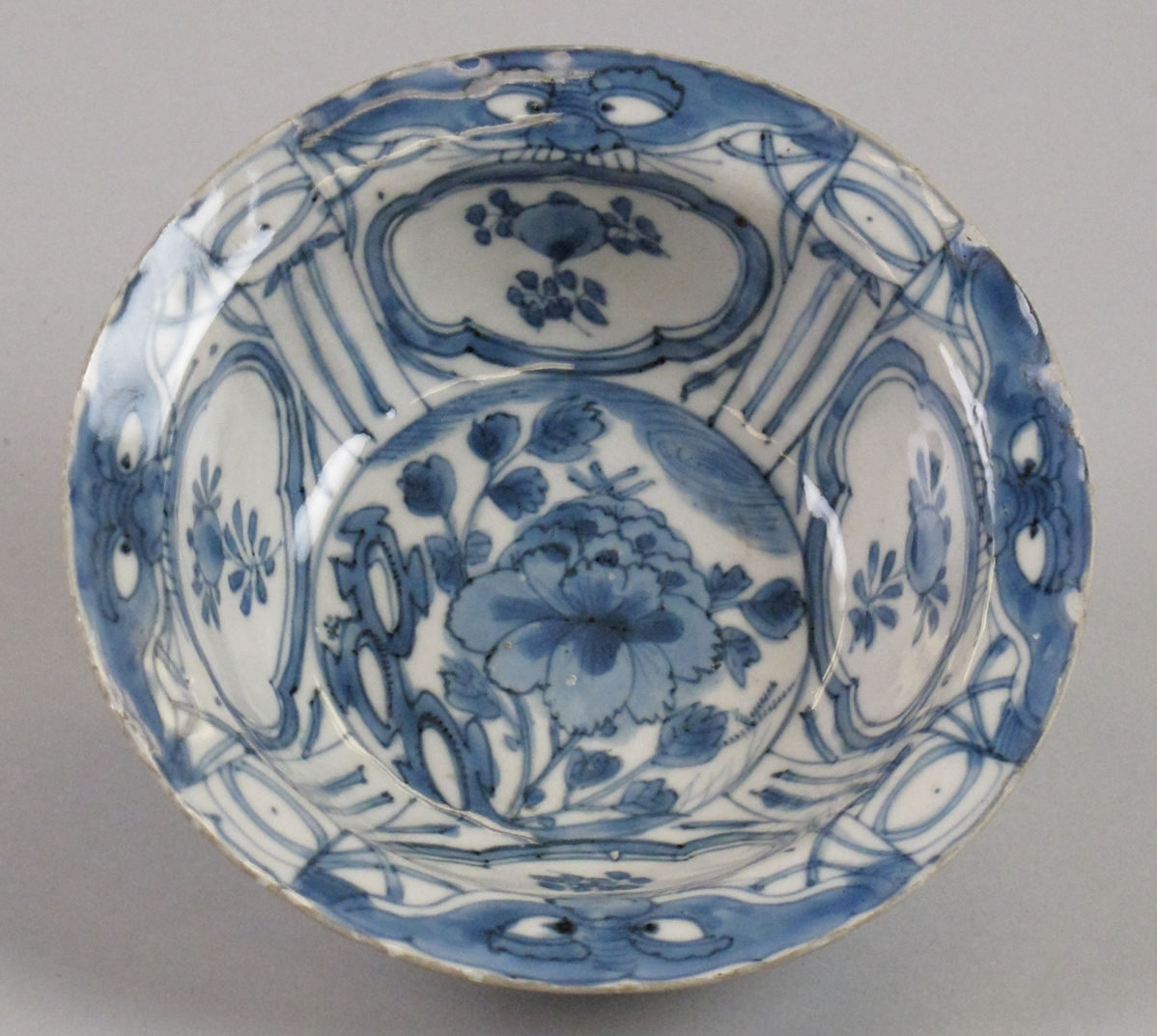
Bowl, c. 1600

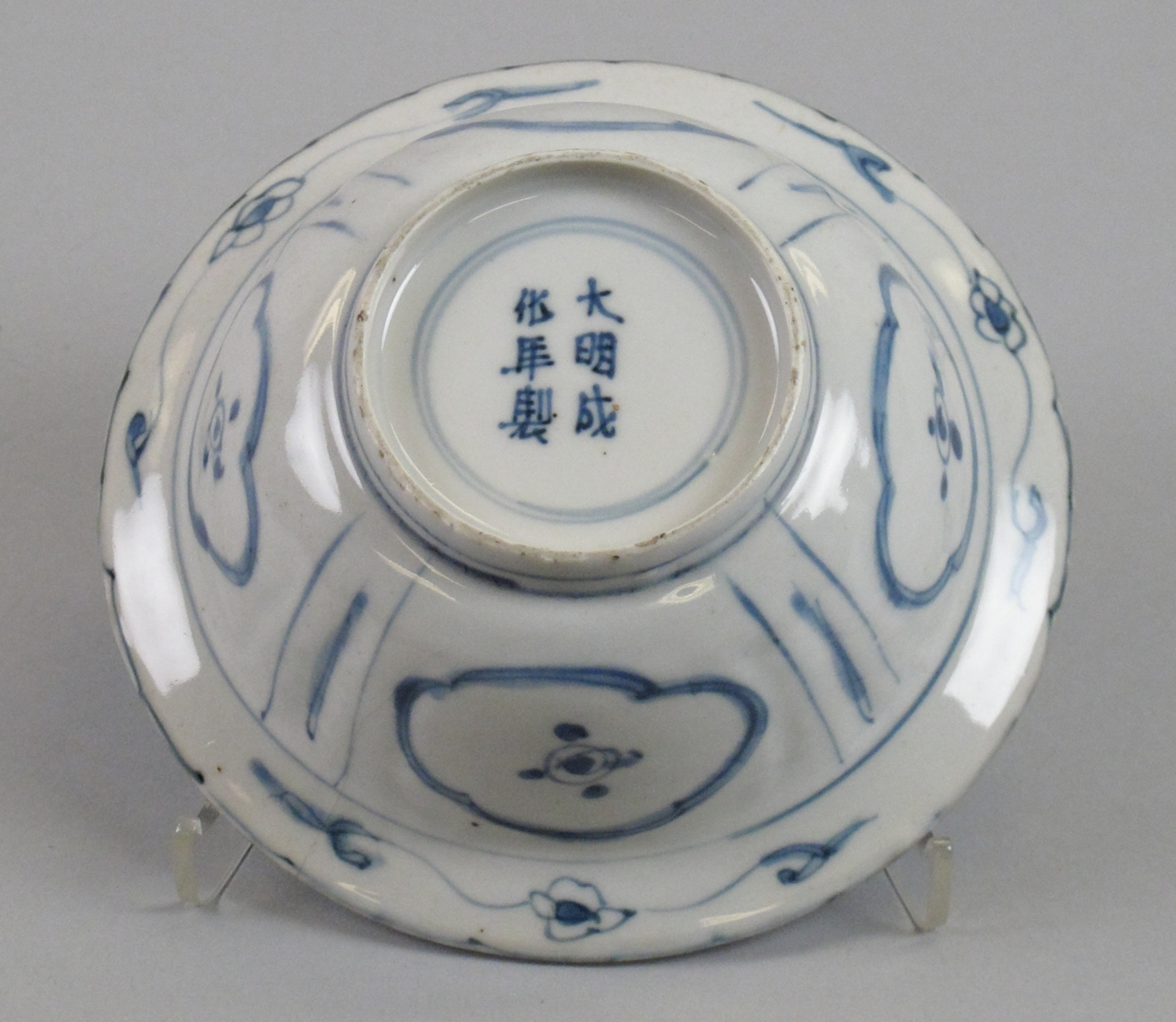
Last piece from below

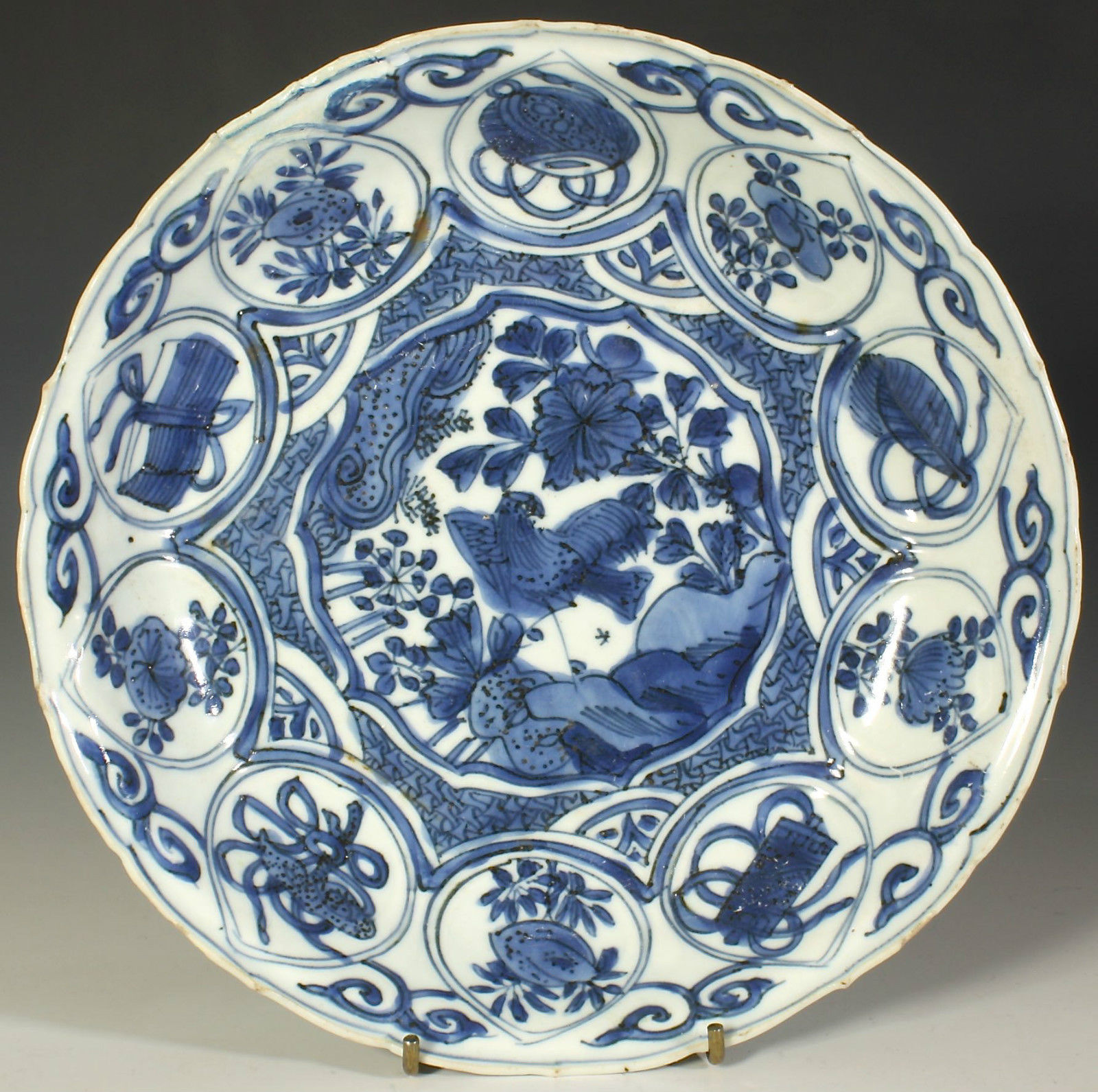
Kraak porcelain plate 20 cm across

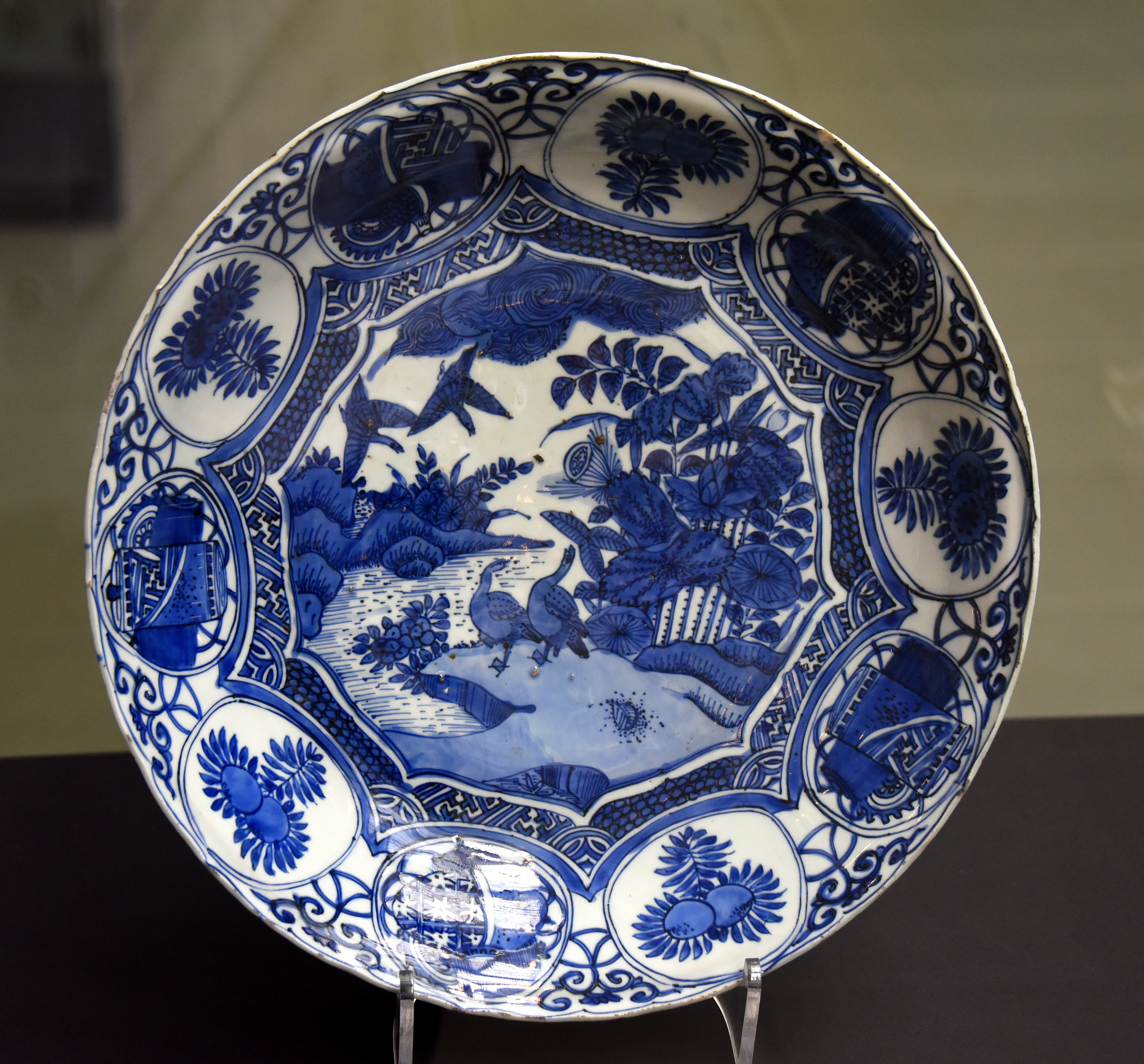
Kraak dish. Porcelain decorated with underglaze blue. 1591–1613 CE. From Jingdezhen, China. Victoria and Albert Museum, London

== Influence ==
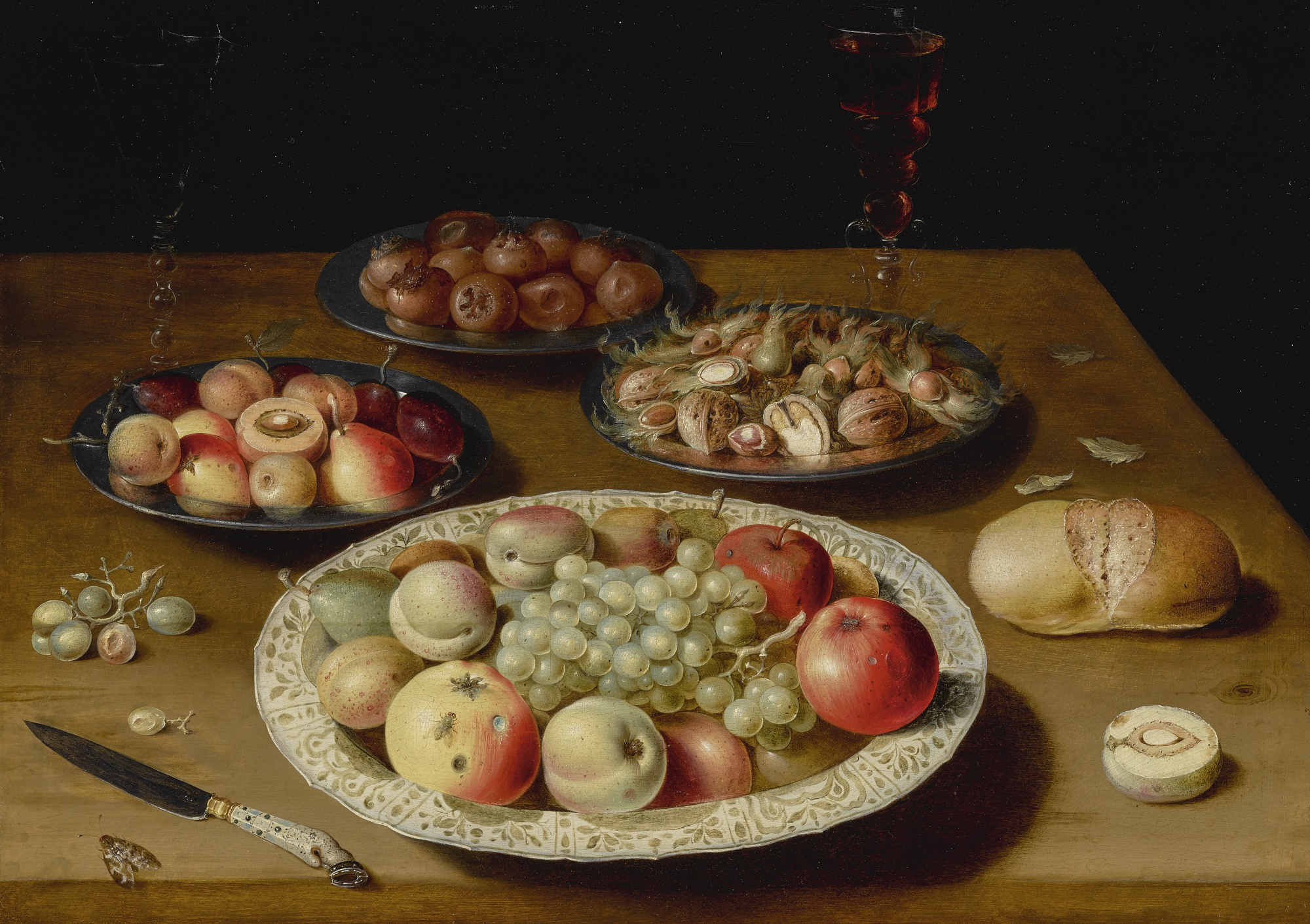
Still life with a large Kraak ware dish of fruit by Osias Beert, c. 1610

Kraak was copied and imitated all over the world, by potters in Arita, Japan and Persia—to which Dutch merchants turned when, after the fall of the Ming dynasty in 1644, Chinese originals were no longer available—and ultimately in Delft. As noted above, it made a frequent appearance in the sumptuous Dutch paintings of the seventeenth century (see also the detail of de Heem's Banquet Still Life).

Today a great deal is learned about Kraak ware through excavation of shipwrecks by marine archaeologists. Because the wreck can usually be dated with some degree of certainty, its contents provides a clear snapshot of production at the moment the vessel went down. Moreover, its location can also indicate its destination point, thus revealing much about international trade routes and outposts at the time. In contrast to the other major European imports of the time (for example textiles or spices), ceramics are able to withstand exposure to water, thus making it the ideal merchandise to serve as ballast cargo in the great ships. Yet from another perspective, porcelain's durability in this sense, even withstanding centuries of submersion at the bottom of the sea, means that it has been the good that has endured (sometimes even intact) to tell these tales.

=== Gallery of Kraak ware imitations made outside China ===
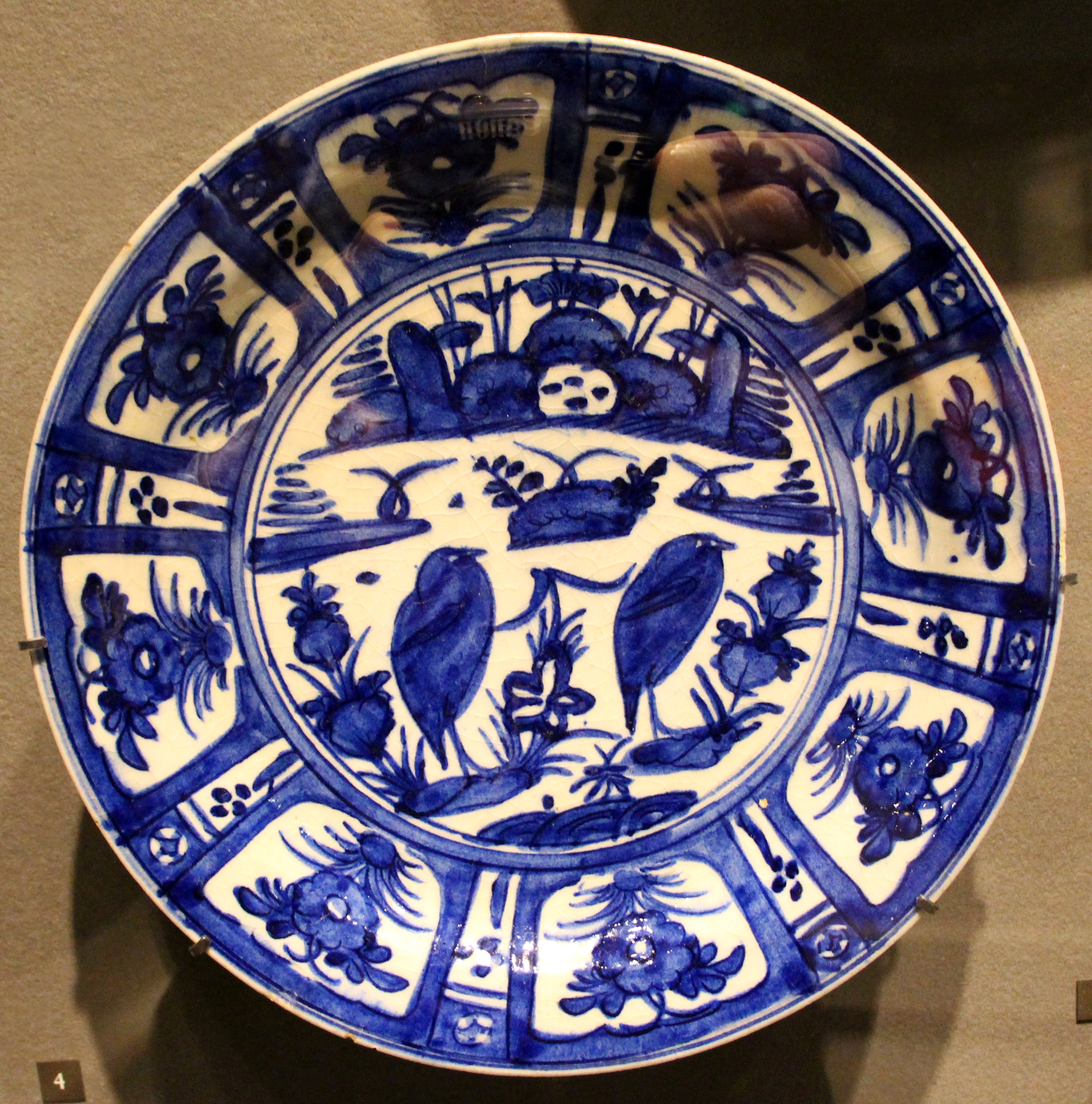
Iran, probably Isfahan, 1580–1630

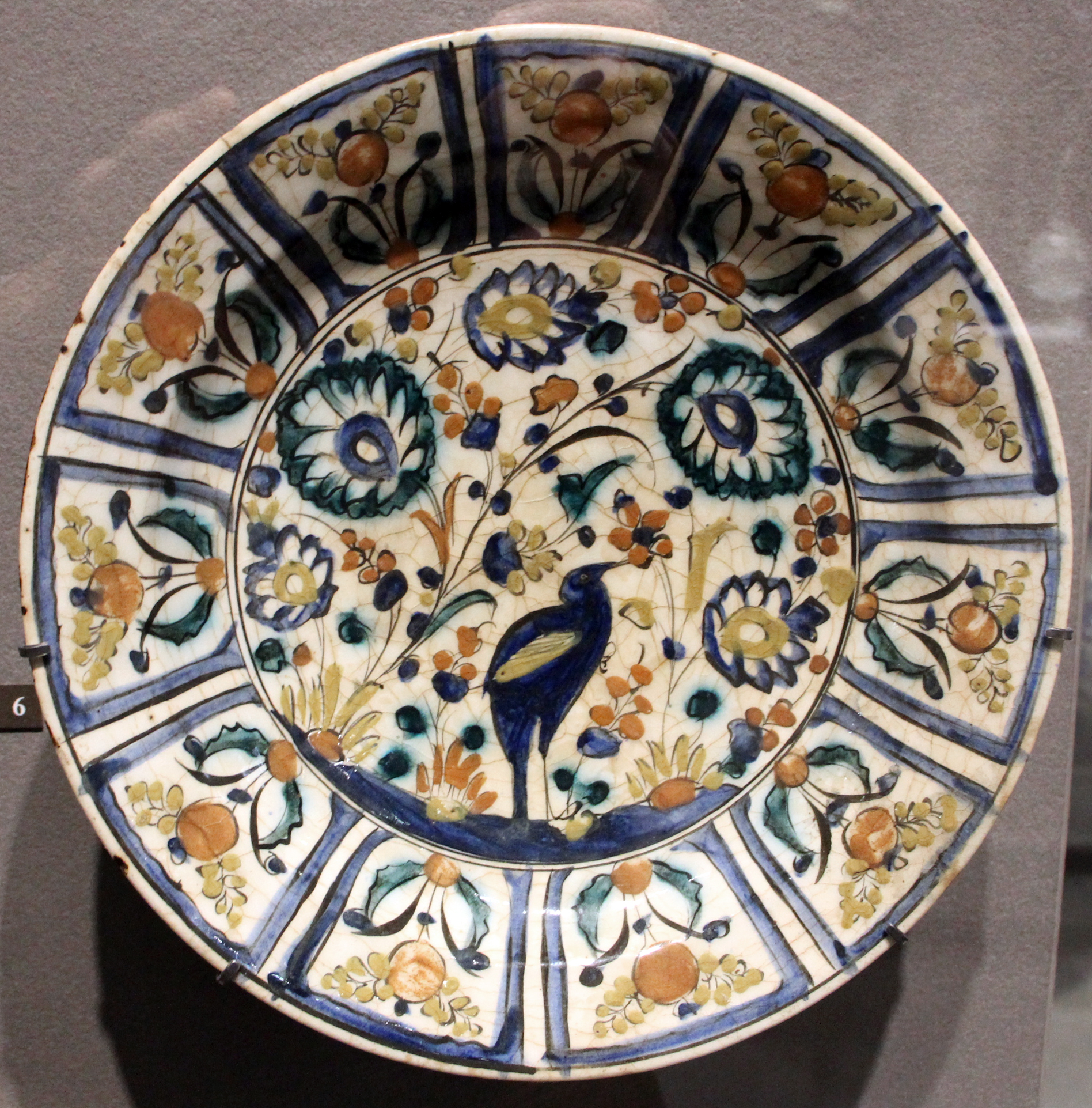
Iran, probably Isfahan, 1580–1630

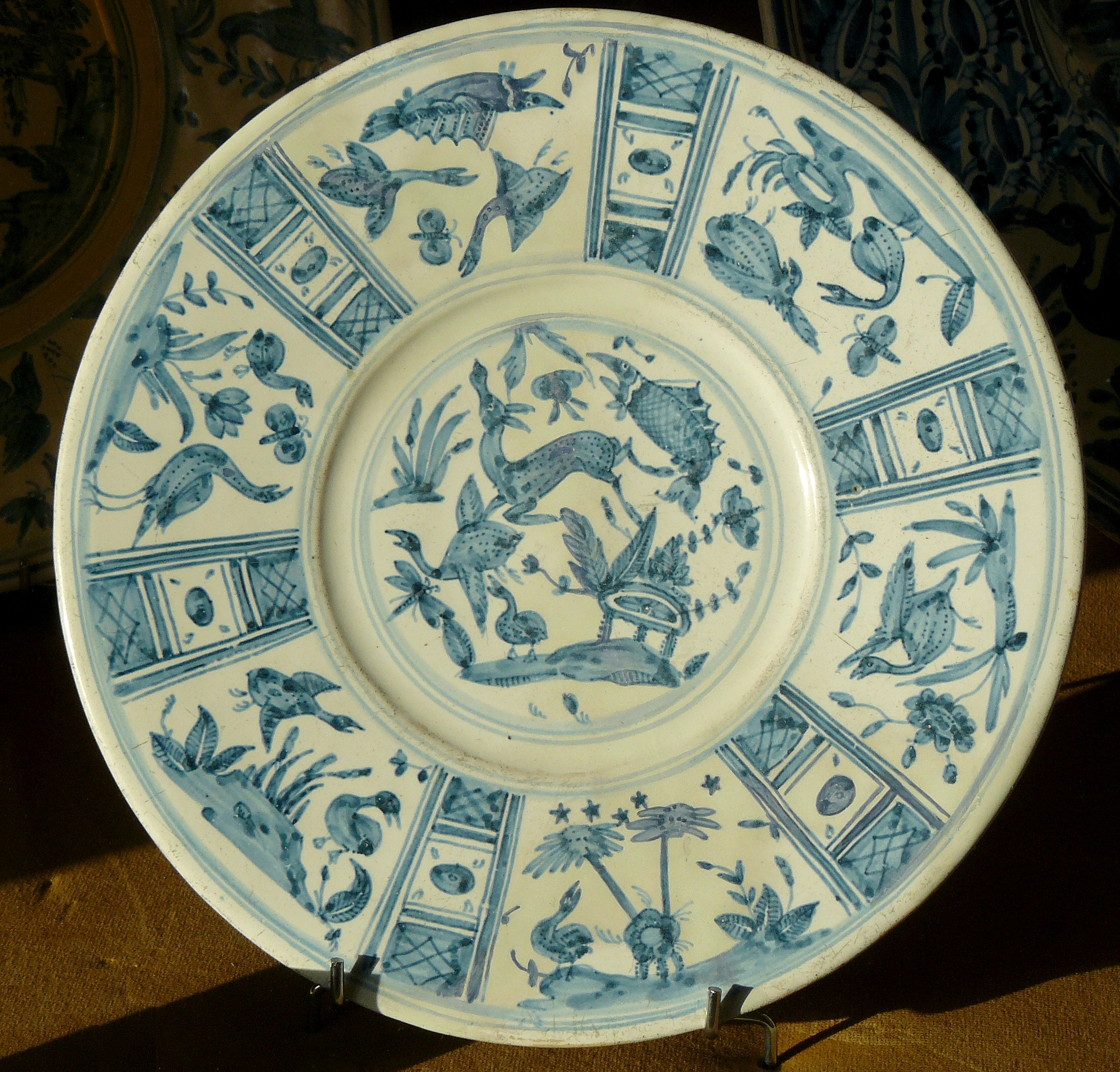
French Nevers faience, Conrade factory, 1630s

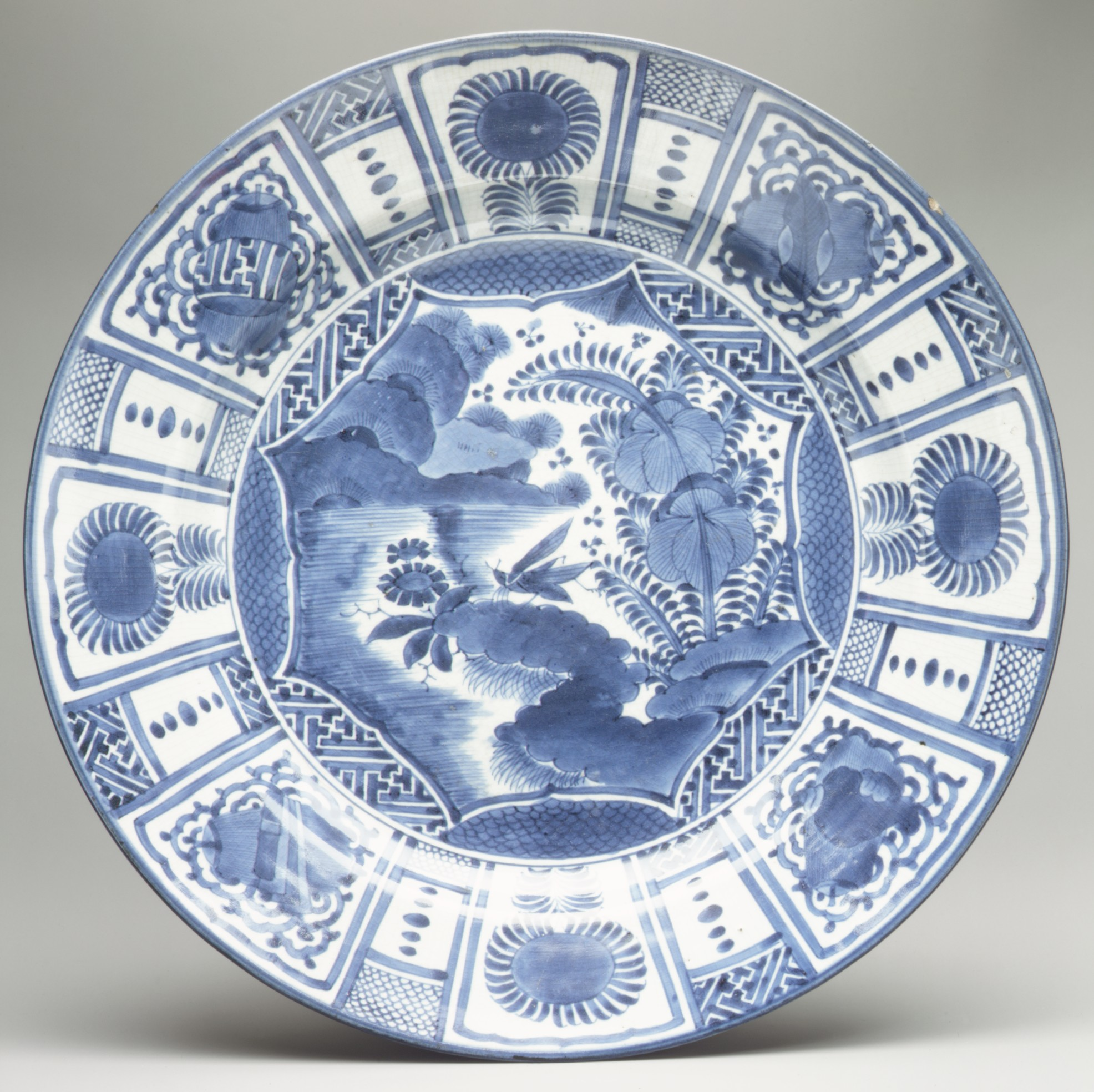
Japanese export porcelain, for the European market, c. 1670

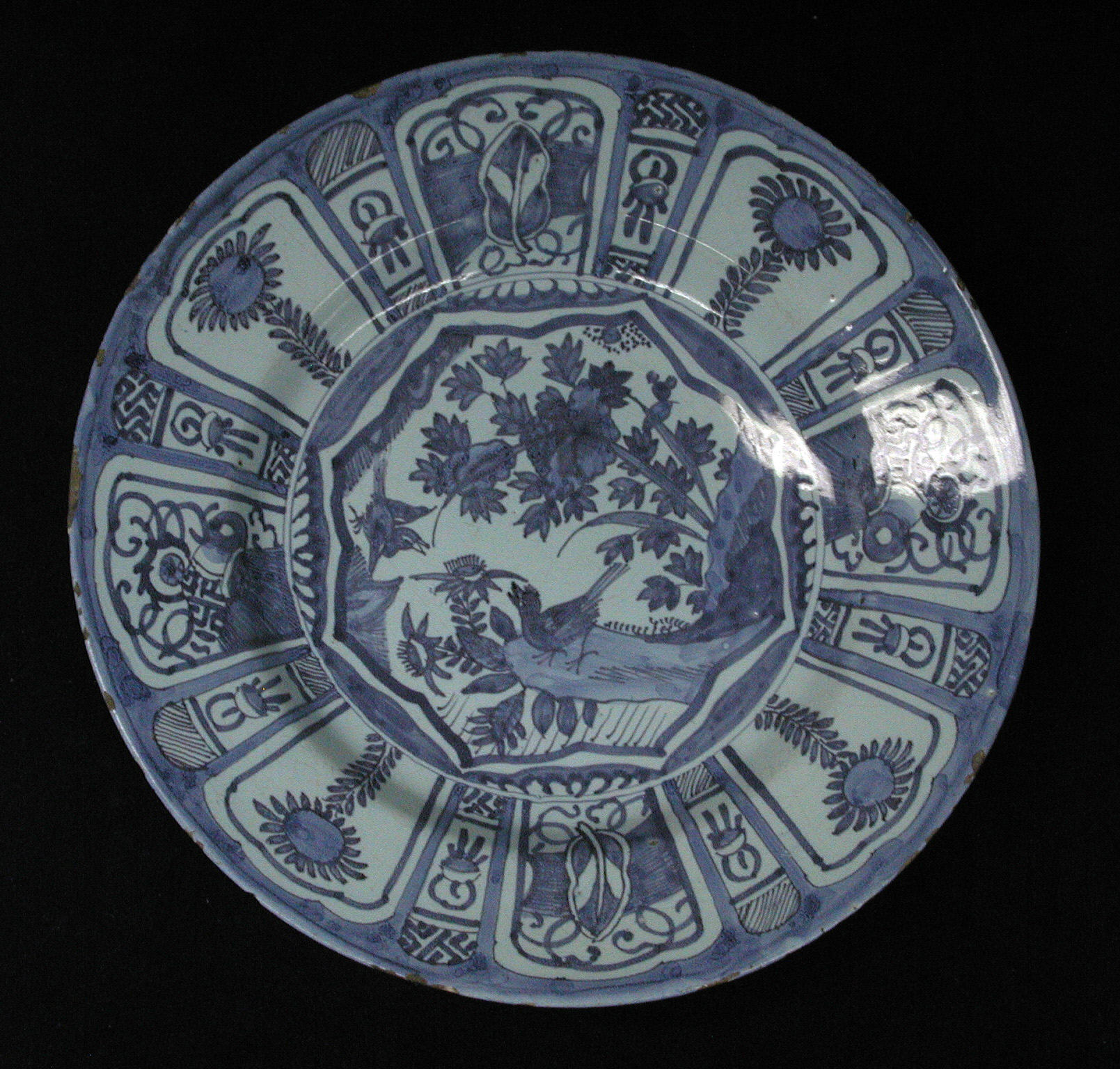
"Possibly German", late 17th-century

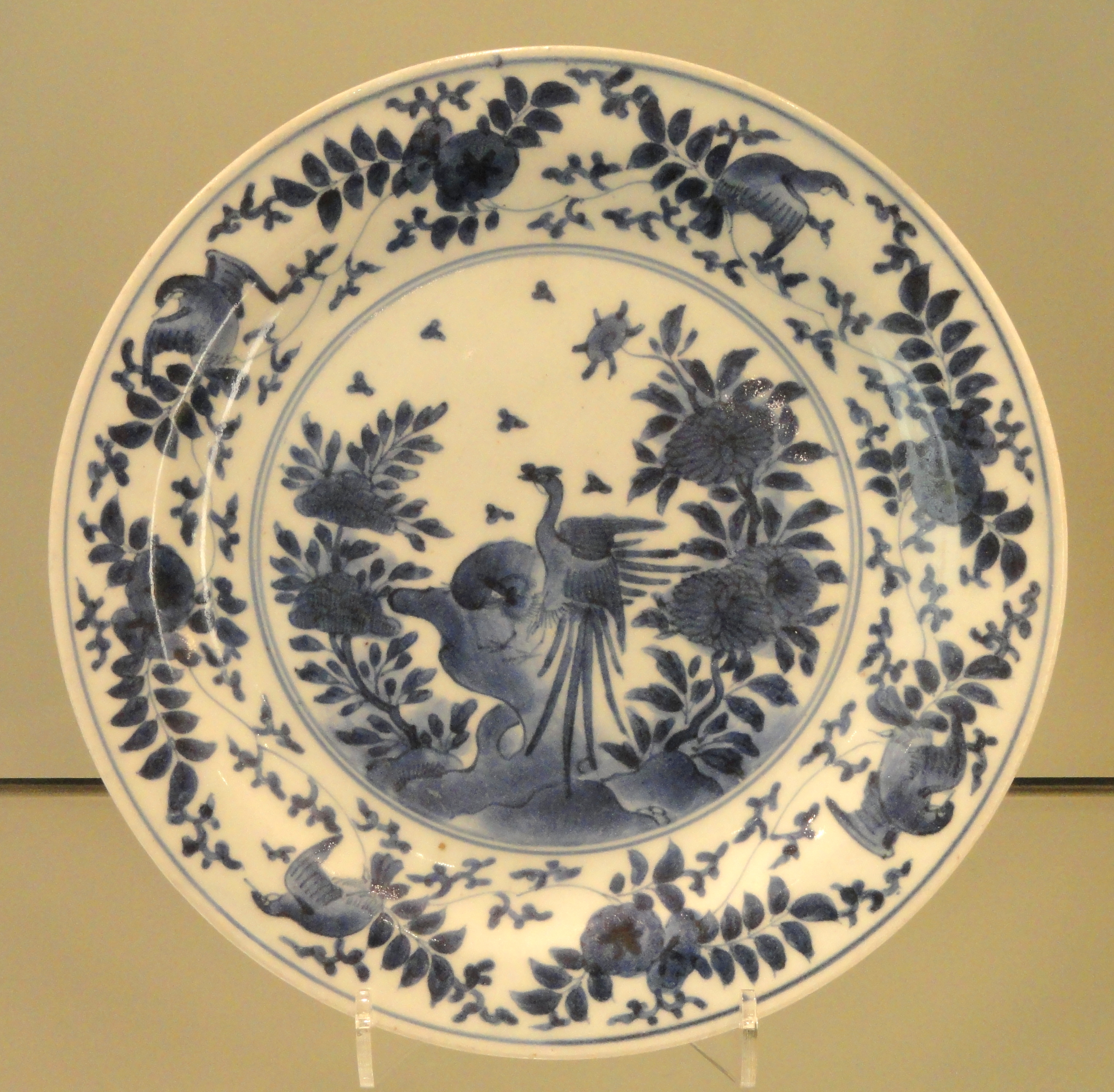
Japan, Arita ware, c. 1690–1700

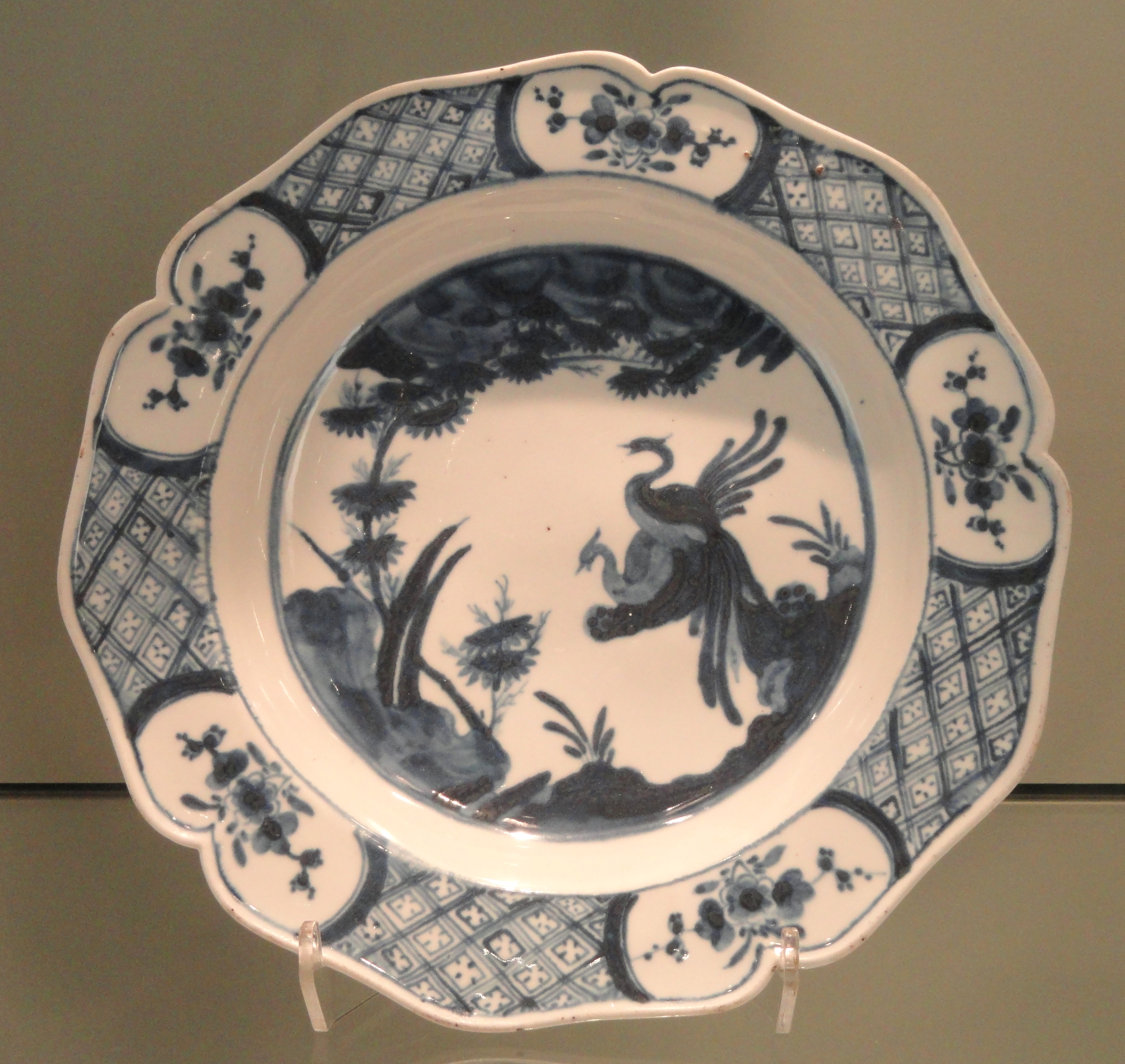
England, Chelsea porcelain, c. 1752–1755

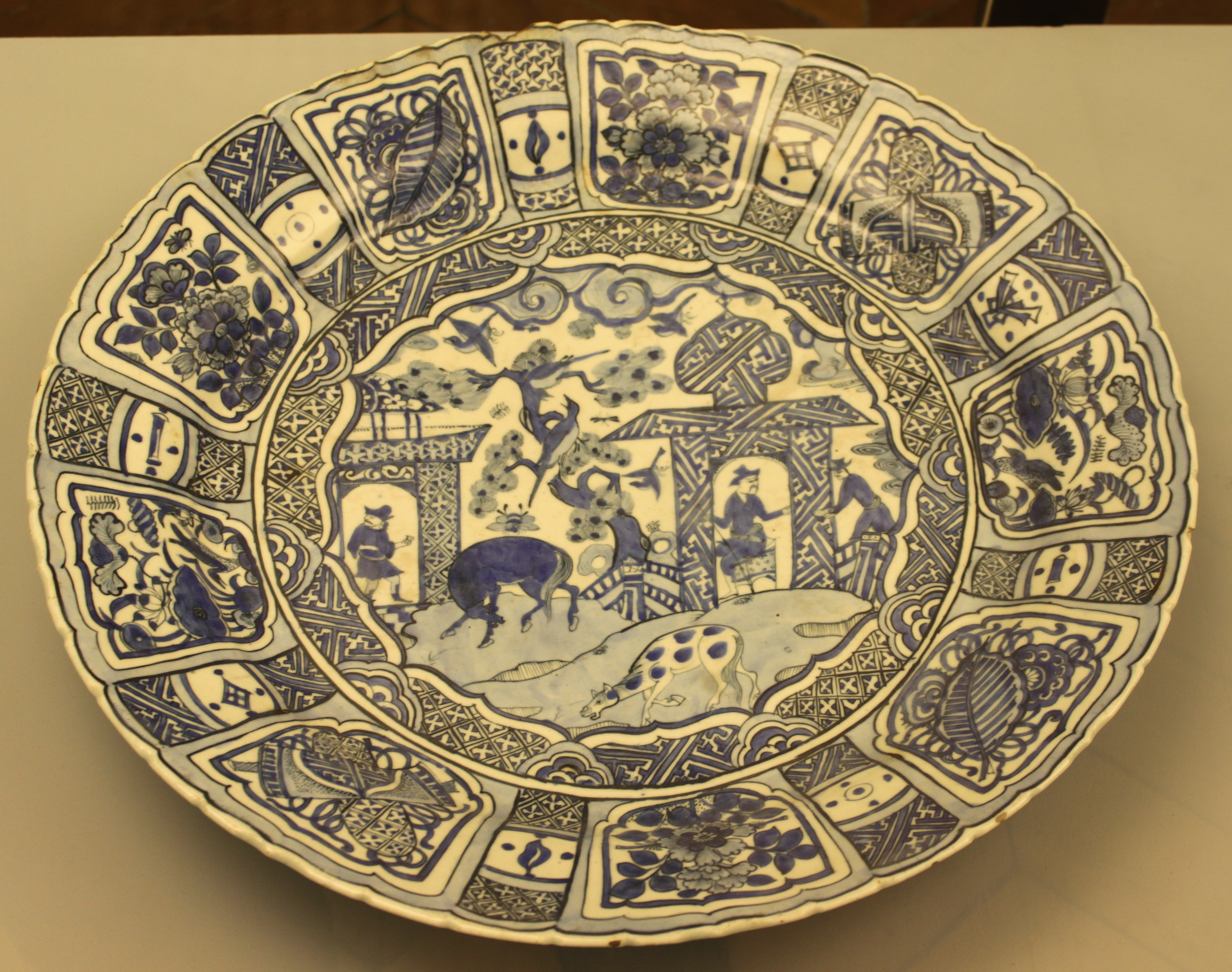
Iran, 18th-century
